The global weather activity of 2010 includes major meteorological events in the Earth's atmosphere during the year, including winter storms (blizzards, ice storms, European windstorms), hailstorms, out of season monsoon rain storms, extratropical cyclones, gales, microbursts, flooding, rainstorms, tropical cyclones, and other severe weather events.

The thunderstorm season for the Northern Hemisphere began near spring, beginning on March 1, and ended on August 31.

January

January 1–3

Fresh overnight snowfall on New Year's Eve and New Year's Day caused disruption in north east England, with roads across Northumberland, Tyne and Wear, County Durham and Teesside affected. Snow also fell in parts of East Cumbria.

A major snow-related weather warning was put out in Alaska on December 30. The expected snowstorm was probably part of the same weather system that hit the Russian Far East from December 30 to January 5.

Between January 1 and 2, 2010, 50- and 70-year record low temperatures and snowfall hit northern China and Korea starting January 1. Blizzards also hit Mongolia's Dundgobi province.

A heavy storm surge hit northeastern New Brunswick on January 2, leading to over $750,000 in damage in the community of Port Elgin.

Heavy record-breaking snow also fell in Moscow in early January 2010 and light snow briefly fell in Greece and Turkey.

On January 2, a weather front with a northerly wind brought heavy snow to the northwest of England. Wythenshawe near Manchester Airport had  of snow. This affected road transport on January 2, particularly in the Greater Manchester area with conditions on the M60, M602 and M66 reported to be poor, while Snake Pass, which links Manchester with Sheffield was closed.

As a snowstorm entered Scotland, a number of roads across the country were closed including three junctions of the M9 while the motorway was shut in both directions at the Newbridge Roundabout in Edinburgh during the evening because of heavy snow, and did not open again until the following day. Problems were also reported on the A96 and the A939. Rail services between Inverness and Central Scotland were also affected by poor weather.

Possibly more than 200 people died in northern India, mostly in Uttar Pradesh after a cold snap and accidents in heavy fog around January 2 and 3.

Heavy rain fell in parts of southwestern Brazil. At least 35 people were killed at a resort on Ilha Grande: about 40 people were staying in the hotel which was buried under a mudslide, and the death toll is expected to rise further. In Rio Grande do Sul, at least seven people are dead and 20 missing after a bridge collapsed due to heavy rains. It is reported to be one of the worst mudslides in Rio de Janeiro's history.

January 4–5
On January 4, heavy rain fell in Brazil.

Heavy snow fell in northern China and grounded hundreds of flights on the 4th. It and forced Hong Kong's Financial Secretary John Tsang and Monetary Authority Chief Executive Officer Norman Chan to cancel a trip to Beijing. Beijing was hit by a blizzard starting the evening of the 2nd, with 70–80% of flights canceled out of Beijing Capital International Airport on January 4. Close to 20 cm of snow fell in the north of the city, and close to 25 cm in Seoul. Schools across the area were closed, and Premier Wen asked local governments to ensure safe transportation, continued food supplies, and continued agricultural production. Continued snowstorms were forecast for the city of Beijing and the province of Inner Mongolia. It was also predicted on January 7 for snow to reach the provinces of Jiangsu, Anhui, Henan and Hubei on January 9 according to China National Radio. One person was killed in Xinjiang Autonomous Region as a result of the storm. Emergency services handed out extra cattle fodder in Tibet.

Japan's Hokkaido island was hit by heavier snowfall, causing heavy travel disruption and some airport closures.

By January 4 about 30 people, including 28 children and an elderly man, died from cold-related causes in the last 11 days across Bangladesh as snow and a cold wave swept over the north and center of the nation. Freezing fog also occurred on the 4th in Punjab, India. Some parts of Bangladesh were the hardest hit with temperatures plummeting as low as 6 °C according to meteorologist Sanaul Haque, who predicted the cold wave may continue for another day.

The New Brunswick villages of Upper Cape and Port Elgin were devastated as a massive hurricane-strength blizzard hit Nova Scotia, New Brunswick and Prince Edward Island on January 4, causing massive blackouts in its wake.

Light snow briefly fell in Lebanon, Jordan, Israel and Palestine and further snow was reported in Niigata, Japan.

Heavy rain and severe cold hit southern Bangladesh and Italy.

On the 4th, the UN issued a Green Alert in Albania as northern rivers swell with melt water

In its monthly summary, Met Éireann, Ireland's weather service, said December was the coldest month for 28 years for most of the country and the coldest of any month since February 1986 at a few stations.

In Scotland, Fife Council became the first local authority to confirm that its supply of grit was exhausted on January 4, after it received less than it had ordered from suppliers. Government Ministers denied there was a shortage of grit and salt and insisted there were "very substantial" supplies for Scotland's roads.

Italy suffered from both heavy rain in the south and heavy snow in the north.

January 4 saw four villages in Sakhalin lose power as a result of a storm. The 2,000 strong town of Tomari was worst hit. Blizzard struck Sakhalin island, a narrow island in the stormy Sea of Okhotsk, off the coast of Siberia and just 25 miles north of Japan's snowy Hokkaido island.

On January 4, many motorways in Shandong were closed and 19 flights canceled in the Yantai International Airport. Eventually the No. 1820 train, carrying more than 800 passengers, started off at after being stranded for 12 hours.

January 4 saw Seoul's heaviest snowfall since 1937 according to the Korea Meteorological Administration (KMA). The blizzard dumped  of snow on the town.

Avalanches and heavy snow hit the Russian's Sakhalin Island, which was smothered by a snow cyclone and blizzard, the Island's emergency officials said.

Civil authorities were put on a major alert in the snow-torn province of Shandong on January 4 as more snow fell in both Shandong and Beijing. Travel was affected as the snowstorm paralyzed Beijing on January 4, 2010.

January 5 in northeastern China saw a smooth flow of traffic, with no gridlock or serious traffic accidents being reported after the snowstorm that caused traffic chaos on the 4th, according to the Beijing Traffic Management Bureau. The city's bus and subway train services were up and running according as plan. During the peak hours on Monday morning, the Beijing Subway Operating Company dispatched 20 additional trains to ease the heavy passenger flow. The bus of all routes started off on time that morning, according to the Beijing Public Transport Holdings. Inner Mongolia was still in a critical situation as teams batteled to clear severe rural snow drifts.

4–8 inches (10–20 centimeters) of snow fell in Beijing on the 5th, in the largest snowfall since 1951.

The 2,000 weather modification offices in China, which are responsible for bombing the skies with silver iodide to induce rain or snow, were put into use. Schools in Beijing and Tianjin closed and because the cities' traffic was in chaos. The capital received the harshest Siberian winds in decades. Temperatures for the 5th were forecast to plunge to −16 °C, a 40-year record low, after a daytime maximum of −8 °C. The head of the Beijing Meteorological Bureau, Guo Hu, linked the blizzard-like conditions of the first week of January to unusual atmospheric patterns caused by global warming.

Heavy snow started to fall in Seoul, South Korea and it was reported that a leading North Korean Communist party official had frozen to death, in his home, situated in the country's Sepo kun (or county).

During the traffic peak hours of Monday morning, the Beijing Subway Operating Company dispatched 20 additional subway trains to ease the heavy passenger flow. City workers were deployed to clean the snow in the city's main roads with about 15,710 tonnes of snow-dissolving agent, Beijing Environmental Sanitation Group Co., Ltd. official Zhang Zhiqiang said. On the 4th, many motorways in Shandong were closed and 19 flights were canceled at Yantai International Airport.

In Inner Mongolia, 13 trains were delayed that Monday in Hohhot, the regional capital, according to the Hohhot railway authorities.

The Met Office issued weather warnings for every region in the UK except the Northern Isles. BBC Weather and the Met Office also warned that temperatures in the Highlands of Scotland could drop to  later in the week. The Met Office also confirmed that the UK is experiencing the longest prolonged cold spell since December 1981. The Harrogate district endured over six inches and had been a regular feature on BBC News broadcasts.

Most parts of Scotland had further snowfalls during the night of January 4/5.

Due to shortage of road grit conventionally made from rock salt, road grit was being made by or for road-gritters from cooking-type salt mixed with builders' sand; and the public bought up large amounts of cooking salt and table salt from food shops to put on their paths and drives. The Government was reported to have reallocated reserve supplies of road salt and grit from Oxfordshire and Buckinghamshire and sent it to Cumbria and Fife due to the higher priority of even lower salt and grit reserves, along with the greater snow clearance work, according to Radio Oxford.

A heat wave and/or unforeseen monsoon weather also hit parts of Australia in early 2010. Victoria, the scene of horrific bushfires the year before, had a far colder summer, with hot weather arriving more than a month later than usual in 2009. August 17 saw a dust storm at Laguna Mar Chiquita as a major drought hit Argentina, and flooding and hailstorms hit southeastern Australia and Queensland in March 2010. The lack of winter precipitation in parts of China, however, contributed to a severe drought in the southwest. Bolivia, Venezuela, Mali, Mauritania, Morocco and Spain have also seen periods of drought in 2009 and 2010. On between May 12 and 26, both Mauritania, the Sénégal River Area and neighboring parts of both Senegal and Mali faced both a drought and famine in 2010.

January 6–9
Snow and fog occurred in Germany from January 3 to 10. The Finnish railways and Helsinki airport are disrupted by further snowfall and record low temperatures for the Helsinki region.

On January 6, the London Borough of Harrow closed 58 schools and 73 flights were canceled at Heathrow as 3 cm of snow fell at Heathrow Airport.

Continued snowstorms were forecast for the city of Beijing and the province of Inner Mongolia. Electricity rationing started on January 7. Snow had started falling in Gangsu province by January 7. It also was projected on January 7 to have reached the provinces of Jiangsu, Anhui, Henan and Hubei on January 9 according to China National Radio.

The Chinese government said that China faced its worst ice risk in 30 years. By the night of January 8–9, the major snowstorms predicted on January 7 for the provinces of Jiangsu and Anhui, had arrived and the emergency services were put on alert.

Continued snowstorms were forecast for the city of Beijing and the province of Inner Mongolia. Snow reached the provinces of Jiangsu, Anhui, Henan and Hubei on January 9. One person was killed in Xinjiang Autonomous Region as a result of the storm.

The synoptic situation in northern Europe settled to a steady northeast wind which brought snow showers and belts of snow.

The British Army had to help stranded motorists in southern areas. The Met Office confirmed that  of snow fell in some parts of southern England.

A "severe" warning issued by the Met Office was in place for every region in the UK. Scottish First Minister Alex Salmond said Scotland was experiencing its worst winter since 1963.

Further deaths in Wales, Shetland and Aberdeenshire were recorded. Roads in the southeast were left with long traffic jams and abandoned cars. 8,000 schools were closed.

In Eastern Parts, there were accumulations of 40 cm to 50 cm in places. In Kent, six inches of snow fell in four hours in the early evening.

By January 7, 2010, 22 people had died in the UK because of the freezing conditions.

Heavy snow blocked many roads in the Irish Republic. Dublin Airport closed on Wednesday January 6 and again on Friday January 9. Cork Airport closed on Sunday January 10, at 6:30 pm and did not re-open until 12:30 pm on Monday January 11. Dublin Bus canceled all services for a time. Ireland West Airport Knock was also closed. Varying amounts of snow fell across Ireland on the 7th and 8th and road salt reserves began to run low.

The snow fell heavily in some places of Spain including Prades (Tarragona, southern Catalonia) which received 120 cm of snow after a storm lasting over 30 hours. The BBC News reported heavy snowfall as far south as Granada, in Spain.

25 Nepalese people, mostly children, died as a blizzard swept over most of Nepal on January 7. Snowstorms probably also occurred in mountainous Bhutan and Sikkim, but no reports were forthcoming.

Heavy snow also fell in Chicago on the 7th 

Heavy blizzards and snow storms raged across Germany, Scandinavia and the northwestern parts of European Russia.

In Poland, more snow hit the Lower Silesian Voivodeship, and nine people died across the country in a 48-hour period, bringing the total weather-related deaths to 139 since the start of November, a police spokesman said. Most of the victims were vagrants, whose tragic lifestyle left them prone to the cold.

Switzerland's  Gotthard Road Tunnel reopened to trucks on the 8th, following heavy snowfalls over the previous 2 days.

A heavy and snowy cyclone hit the Aleutian Islands on January 7 and 8. Snow accompanied a cold wave moving south through North America on January 8, and Mexico City received snowfall accumulations. In the mountainous regions, temperatures dropped to −10 °C, killing nine people. The snow continued to fall on the 10th. Bitter weather may have wiped out some Alaskan reindeer as temperatures and snow depths exceeded those of the extraordinarily harsh winter of 1963 to 1964.

January 7 saw the snow and ice continuing to affect the snow-tormented counties of Oxfordshire, Warwickshire, Buckinghamshire, Gloucestershire and Northamptonshire. Because of the dangerous conditions concerning the build-up of snow and black ice, Banbury Museum, the Cherwell District Council customer service center and Cherwell District Council tourist information center were closed. Many Oxfordshire locations had between 1 and 2 ft of unmelted snow by then. Cherwell District Council workers began using a mixture of table salt and sand instead of their diminishing road grit and rock salt supplies.

The snow continued in to the 9th and the UK almost ran out of road salt, rock salt, table salt and road grit supplies due to the heavy demand from various agencies and local government bodies.

By January 7, 2010, twenty-two people had officially died in the UK because of the freezing conditions. The Department of Health wildly overestimated that the cold weather could cause up to 40,000 excess deaths in the UK if it continued much longer. 122 people had already died in Poland, most of them reportedly homeless and 11 had died in Romania. Deaths in Bosnia and Austria luckily stood at only 4, with Kosovo only losing 1 life so far.

The heavy snowfall across the British Isles between January 6 to 9, resulted in large-scale traffic disruption, closed airports, many canceled trains and hundreds of school closures. A polar low developing in the English Channel brought fronts of snow over southern England before moving south and dissipating. Two middle-aged men died after falling into a frozen lake in Leicester, in the English Midlands. 27 major companies in Britain were ordered to halt using gas on the 9th in order to maintain supplies amid unprecedented levels of demand and major companies had their gas turned off on the 8th, in the first such move since 2003, although there was no immediate danger for households of supplies running out. The Automobile Association, a motor vehicle breakdown service, said they had dealt with about 340,000 breakdowns since December 17, including a local government snow plough that had overturned after it had hit black ice near Huddersfield. A representative from Oxfordshire also confessed to the local media that they had a snowplough breakdown earlier in the day. Several thousand schools remained closed and several of the weekend's Premier League football matches were canceled.

Heavy snow fell in the North of England throughout the day giving significant accumulations. A high of −7.7 °C was recorded at Tulloch Bridge.

Heavy snow fell in Denmark on January 8. By the evening of January 8, the Rügen Islands off the northeast coast of Germany was covered, on average, in 30 centimeters of snow while the capital Berlin was carpeted with snow and ice. Autoclub Europa warned that chaotic traffic conditions could potentially leave large parts of Germany completely paralyzed as the country prepared for further freezing conditions as forecasters warned that temperatures would drop below −20 degrees Celsius (−4 degrees Fahrenheit) overnight. German officials had also acknowledged a shortage of grit and fear that high winds and drifting snow had closed may German autoroutes and roads, along with parts of Frankfurt airport. As shortages in road salt and grit were already being feared, while the authorities recommended that people consider stocking up with a few days' worth of food and water. The A5 autoroute leading from Baden-Württemberg into France was closed on Friday afternoon, leading to a queue of hundreds of lorries building up. The road was opened again on Saturday morning, enabling careful drivers to proceed with their journeys. Snow was also proving to be a major problem in Saxony and the Rhineland. The country's nature protection group N.A.B.U. has recommended that people put out food for birds since the cold and snowy weather had ruined their usual feeding patterns.

Meanwhile, some light snow also fell in Kosovo, Udmurtia and Ryazan Oblast, but heavier snow fell in many parts of Ukraine. Temperatures fell as low as −30 °C and −29 °C in parts of Ukraine and similar temperatures occurred in neighboring parts of Russia. Heavy show would hit Moscow on the 9th.

A husky dog race took place in Thetford on the 8th.

On Saturday, January 9, Banbury officer PC Paul Froggatt urged people not to try walking on the frozen Oxford Canal by the Castle Quay Shopping Centre in Banbury or in Oxford city. Thames Valley Police had also logged cases of people falling through the ice in Milton Keynes, Bracknell and Aylesbury. One man even tried to drive his car down a part of the frozen canal in Oxford and nearly died after it fell through the ice, while another man died on Teesside as he tried to rescue some puppies that were stranded on melting ice on the River Tees. Oxford City Council also warned of the dangers of playing on the frozen canal and/or frozen lakes.

A new wave of heavy snow was first reported central and northern France on January 9, with both the Cotentin Peninsula and Paris being the worst-affected parts of France. The French government said all non-essential travel should be avoided in these localities. Significant snowfalls caused major delays to train services, blocked roads and some 15,000 people in areas around city of Arles experienced power cuts power lines collapsed under the weight 30 centimeters of snow. Airlines canceled a quarter of flights on Paris's main Charles de Gaulle airport. Road salt and grit supplies were running low in some districts due to their unexpectedly heavy use.

January 10–11

Heavy rain and melt water caused the worst floods in Albania in nearly 50 years, as 2, 500 homes being evacuated. An artificial lake in the Kosinj valley overflowed after it rose by 8 centimeters in 1 hour. The worst hit areas in Albania were the Shkodra district and to a lesser degree Tirana.

On January 10, Croatia declared a national flood emergency as the Neretva river valley is flooded. The town of Metkovic was also flooded as the river reached a near-record high level. Northern Croatia also got flooded in related storm system. Heavy hailstorms also hit the Dubrovnik that day.

Snow hit the Czech Republic on January 10.

During the early hours of January 10, light snow showers spread across parts of Central England and Wales. On the 11th rain, sleet and snow traveled northwards throughout the early hours. Allenheads in England had fears over a potential  snowdrift.

More than 300 flights were canceled in the 10th and 11th at Germany's Frankfurt Airport. All three runways were cleared and being used by the 12th despite of light snow falls that day.

The snowstorms and blizzards of the 11th brought widespread travel chaos to Germany, Austria, Switzerland and Hungary. Airports, Motorways and railways were closed en masse due to heavy snow and ice. Lithuania, Latvia, Estonia, Finland, Liechtenstein, the Czech Republic and Slovakia also reported some snowfall.

The Banbury Guardian and Oxford Mail released videos and photos of Oxford and Banbury on the 11th as part of a name and shame campaign against the idiotic people walking on the frozen canal.

January 10 saw heavy snow fall in Chicago.

On January 10, Los Angeles Mayor Antonio Villaraigosa canceled a trip to Washington to monitor L.A.'s response to the Southern California rainstorms. Villaraigosa had been scheduled to address the U.S. Conference of Mayors' winter meeting at the nation's capital on Wednesday and was going speak about the success of the city's summer jobs program for at-risk youth.

Freezing rain storms battered parts of Sichuan, Yunnan and Hubei, killing dozens of people.

On January 10, 1 person died and 5,435 were evacuated after a snowstorm in Xinjiang Uygur Autonomous Region according to the Ministry of Civil Affairs. A total of 261,800 people in 12 counties or cities were affected by the blizzards.

On January 11, intense snowstorms hit a still beleaguered Europe. Many cars and a lorry were stuck in drifting snow near the northern German town of Soehlen. The German transport ministry warned people to travel on essential journey only. Polish authorities reported that there were about 140 hypothermia deaths in Poland, that nearly 50,000 Polish residents without electricity, that the PKP trains were delayed by as much as 9 hours and that most of Poland's homeless shelters were overflowing. Some shops were running out of drinking chocolate. A similar situation was also occurring in the shops and homeless shelters of the Czech Republic. Snow also fell in Belarus.

Coal supplies ran low at power plants as the death toll rose to two in the strong snowstorm in the Altai and temperatures fell to −40 °C on January 12.

January 12–14
On January 12, heavy snow caused hundreds of accidents, halted flights, and downed power lines in Poland; more than 160 people were trapped overnight on a frozen stretch of German roadway. Hundreds of road accidents were also reported in Germany over the weekend, especially along the Baltic Coast, where two men were killed in a car they were driving when it hit a tree in Nordvorpommern after skidding in the treacherous conditions. Austria, Switzerland and Liechtenstein were also badly hit by snowy and freezing conditions.

Both the National Beef Association and National Farmers' Union Scotland asked for the Scottish Government to help rebuild steadings, which in some cases are not covered by insurance. Heavy snowfall continued for a second day in Aberdeenshire, Aberdeen and Rutland.

A further 5 to 10 cm of snow fell across the UK during the midday of January 12, including Stafford in Staffordshire. Many schools were once again closed across England and Wales. There were many road accidents and closures; the M25 motorway was down to one lane between Leatherhead and Reigate whilst roads stretching right across southern Great Britain were untreated causing havoc for commuters. Gatwick and Birmingham airports were closed and many flights were delayed at Heathrow.

During January 13, the weather system continued north affecting much of Northern England before reaching Scotland.

Eight of Oxfordshire's 33,000-volt electricity substations, which were situated in Kennington, Kidlington, Wheatley, Wantage, Deddington, Eynsham, Berinsfield and Cholsey, near Wallingford failed apparently due to an electrical overload, causing several local blackouts; later saboteurs were officially blamed in the damage, and not an overload or mechanical failure as initially thought, according to Oxford Mail. The only way into the Wye Valley on the 13th, was by snow plough, tractor or quad bike. Teachers and parents helped dig out Princes Risborough School as about 6 inches of snow falls across Buckinghamshire and Oxfordshire, according to Bicester Advertiser and Bucks Herald newspaper. Peter Cornal of Royal Society for the Prevention of Accidents and Principal Jonathan Johnson of Aylesbury Vale Academy both warned people not to skate on Watermead Lake in Buckinghamshire.

On January 14, southerly to south-easterly winds brought bands of snow to northern parts of Britain. An inch of snow fell in Glasgow with further accumulations in areas outside the other towns and cities. Travel was disrupted somewhat.

About 440 Welsh schools were either fully or partially closed on Thursday the 14th.

The English snowfall began to ease on the 14th and the British government ordered an inquiry into the road salt and grit shortage scandal crisis, travel disruption and the poor handling of the disaster by various British companies and agencies.

As the thaw took hold in the UK and France, rain began to fall across the UK. An 11-year-old girl named Naeemah Achha slid up on a patch of ice outside St. Michael from St. John Primary School in Blackburn, Lancashire on the 14th and died later in Royal Manchester Children's Hospital the next day. Head teacher Kay Cant described her as an intelligent, vivacious, kind and popular girl. Blackburn with Darwen Council's leader Michael Lee described her death as a very shocking incident.

It was revealed on the 14th that all of the British county councils, London boroughs and unitary authorities were advised by the government to have six days' supplies of road salt in 2009. Up to 30 councils rejected last year's offer of thousands of tonnes of de-icing salt at a reduced price, to use on the roads this winter according to the BBC. The British Salt Director David Stephen made an offer out of the firm's 60,000 tonnes stockpile at Middlewich, Cheshire, in April 2009, but virtually no one to take up the offer. Evidence suggests that only a few took up the government's advice. The Highways Agency had 13 days worth of road salt, while Glasgow, Kirklees, Derbyshire, Derby City, Buckinghamshire, Cherwell District and the London Borough of Harrow took up the offer and raised their stock piles to seven days worth. The Cherwell Borough, Bicester Parish, Oxfordshire, Slough borough, Harrow, Leicestershire, Buckinghamshire, Fife, Brighton and Hove unitary authority, Liverpool city, Pembrokeshire, Lancashire, Belfast city and Perth and Kinross councils nearly to run out of salt. Scotland, Cumbria, Northumbria and Northern Ireland were getting priority access to salt due to the severity of the local landscape and storm activity.

There were also road closures in Ceredigion including the A4120 at Ponterwyd, and the A4086 at Nant Peris in Gwynedd had been shut down due to hazardous driving conditions. All of Caerphilly's 90 schools and Rhondda Cynon Taf's (RTC) 130 schools either were fully or partially shut except to pupils sitting there. To Wales' Education Minister Leighton Andrews, Welsh First Minister Carwyn Jones and the WJEC exam board helped organize the Welsh GCSEs and A-level exam locations. A Merthyr Tydfil exam was held in a local sports center's hockey arena according to the BBC.

Temperatures of +43.6C were reported in parts of Australia as a heat wave hit most of the country. Heavy rain also fell in parts of Indonesia and Queensland, Australia.

January 15–18
As the snow cleared from the United States, the British Isles and Europe, rain began to fall in place on the 14th and the snow also began to relent in both China, Korea and Japan on the 15th. Light snow was reported in Latvia on the 14th and 15th.

On the 15th, Greater Manchester Police said seven people had been injured when 10 cars crashed on the A627(M) in Oldham.
Met Office severe weather warnings covered Wales and western parts of England and Scotland and snow was forecast for the Pennines and Scottish and Welsh hills. The Environment Agency has warned about flooding in some areas of England and Wales. BBC weather forecaster Sarah Keith-Lucas warned of localized flooding in western parts of the UK caused by melting snow, rain and gale-force winds.

Later on, the Environment Agency warned that heavy rain and snow melting in slightly warmer temperatures meant that there was a risk of some localized flooding from drains, especially in Wales and parts of England, but homes were unlikely to be affected as 15 flood watches were put in place. They warned that flood warnings for possible isolated river flooding in these areas, as heavy rain moves in from the south west on Friday evening. The Met Office and said heavy rain would move in from the west accompanied by strong to gale-force winds on Saturday. The Scottish Environment Protection Agency had five flood watches under way. Thames Valley Police warned motorists about surface flooding and aquaplaning on Oxfordshire's roads.

The 15th brought rain and thawing to much of southwest England and a pocket around Greater Manchester. In the city of Manchester rain on frozen ground had overnight caused glazed frost which had largely (but not completely) gone by morning, and at midday the clouds were running fast from the south; the January snowfall was melting fast, but the pre-Christmas snowfall, which was trodden had half thawed to slush and then frozen hard to solid ice overnight, was slower to melt. In Scotland the thaw melted fresh snow. Flood warnings were issued.

Snow fell in parts of southern Scotland and Yorkshire on the 16th. The Cairngorm Ski Centre was closed as an army of diggers was trying to clear its car park after further snowfalls. The river Derwent was put under a flood watch in places on the 16th.

On January 17, Inner Mongolia Autonomous Region was given more than 850 tons of grain, edible oil and other daily supplies, 4,950 tons of coal and 900 tons of emergency cattle fodder.

On January 17, both melting snow, heavy rain and frozen ground have caused flooding in much of England, Scotland and Wales. The Environment Agency issued a total of 23 flood warnings were issued in England, one in force for Scotland and two in Wales. In Scotland a landslide led to the temporally closure of the A76 in Dumfries and Galloway, while a section of the M74 was shut temporally shut due to flooding.

Many properties in Maesteg, Bridgend, Ebbw Vale and Monmouth were also flooded. Mid and West Wales Fire service sent extra appliances to the Carmarthen Bay holiday village at Kidwelly, where the flooding was described as 'major to severe'. The River Wye, River Dee (Welsh: Afon Dyfrdwy) in the lower Dee Valley, River Cherwell (at Banbury) and River Severn were all in full flood.

Severn Trent Water, which provides water to central England and parts of Wales, said it had drafted in extra staff as ruptured and frozen pipes began to thaw. Many pipes had ruptured in the Welsh Marches and a sewerage pipe had become blocked in outer Birmingham. The company's senior operations manager, Fraser Pithie, said the firm had been called out to more than 470 burst and ruptured pipes since the 10th and their call center staff had taken more than 10,000 calls.

January 17–23

From Sunday, January 17 to Saturday, January 23, 2010, a series of five very powerful winter storms was Pineapple Express, an atmospheric river bore down on Southern California, before moving eastward on January 22. On January 19, a woman was also killed by a tree that fell on her home, on January 19. On January 19, the fourth storm impacted Santee, California. On the afternoon of January 19, the National Weather Service issued two tornado warnings for San Diego County within hours of each other, as potentially tornadic thunderstorms crossed the area.

As the fifth and second-strongest of the week's storms slammed into California on January 20, officials predicted as much as four feet (1.2 metres) of snow would fall in Northern California. On January 20, more than 500 homes were evacuated as floods hit parts of California, as up to 6 inches (15 centimeters) of rain fell in the storms that had impacted the state by then. Rescue and flood prevention services soon brought the situation under control, but one man was killed when a tree fell onto his house. Two horses also died after being hit by lighting in a Santa Barbara field. Rare tornado warnings were issued in parts of Southern California, including southern Los Angeles, Long Beach, Southeastern San Diego County, and Anaheim. Flash flood watches covered Los Angeles, Santa Barbara, and Ventura Counties. On January 20, an EF-0 tornado was reported in Southeastern San Diego County, which lasted for 1 minute, 30 seconds. Jim Rouiller, the senior energy meteorologist at Planalytics Inc., said that the storms (more specifically, the sixth storm) were the worst series of storms the state had experienced since 1997 (when a series of powerful storms caused the New Year's Day 1997 Northern California Flood). On January 21, the sixth storm broke the record of the lowest pressure recorded in parts of California and Oregon. Rouiller expected that evening's storm to bring from 4 to 12 inches of rain, severe mudslides, a few tornadoes, and heavy mountain snow ranging from 6 to 15 feet across the Sierra Nevada mountain range.

California state water officials warned on January 21 that one week of heavy rain and snow was not enough to end the drought, which was entering its fourth year by 2010, though the precipitation from the storms had significantly reduced the severity of the drought. According to measurements on Thursday, January 21, the average water content of state's mountain ranges' snowpacks, considered the state's biggest de facto 'reservoir', was at 107% percent of normal capacity.

On January 22, the sixth storm caused heavy rainfall in parts of Los Angeles, leading to additional flooding. 500 people were evacuated from a small village in La Paz County, Arizona due to a flash flood. Freshly fallen snow blanketed the north side of the San Gabriel Mountains on the morning of January 23, 2010, northwest of Wrightwood, California, after the sixth storm had left. Snow was also reported in many parts of California.

In Yavapai County, floodwaters swept a child to his death.

The sixth storm brought snow across the Great Plains, and even as far east as parts of both Pennsylvania and New Jersey.

Overall, the storms killed at least 10 people, and caused more than $3 million (2010 USD) in damages.

January 19–30
On January 19, heavy rain fell in Oxfordshire and King's Sutton, causing some flooding. The River Cherwell nearly flooded Banbury and parts of Oxford. Light snow fell in the Pennines on January 19.

On January 20, heavy rainstorms wreaked havoc in Haifa, Israel, as snow covered Mount Hermon in the Israeli-occupied Golan Heights.

Both Wakehurst Place, near Ardingly, West Sussex and Bedgebury Pinetum, near Lamberhurst in Kent, were damaged. Iain Parkinson, Wakehurst's woodland and conservation manager who has worked on the estate for 23 years, said it was the worst storm he had ever seen in the park.

A new snow storm came over the Peter the Great Gulf, near Vladivostok on January 21. The Onland Mountains and Sikhote-Alin Mountains were buried in snow as the weather system swept through Primorsky and Khabarovsk Krais, Russia. Lake Khanka froze over and was then covered in snow. The ice on the lake was reported to be several inches thick and the snow was spreading into China's Heilongjiang province.

January 21 witnessed the final day of some Banbury schools remaining closed, after 2 weeks of general closure, in which most remained closed throughout the fortnight. The video of people skating and walking on the Oxford Canal was shown on regional TV again, along with a nationwide online version. Heavy rain fell in Oxfordshire, Warwickshire and Leicestershire as light snow fell in the Pennines on the 22nd.

The snowstorm that began on Friday night, the 22nd was also hitting parts of Bulgaria, where a man suffering from a heart attack died in the country's northeastern region of Silistra, when the ambulance he was being carried on was road that was blocked by several snow drifts. Power, gas and water cuts occurred in Istanbul. In Turkey's western region, near the Greek and Bulgarian borders, villages were cut off and all the major roads were blocked by heavy snow. A bus overturned in Istanbul, injuring 10 people; Bulgarian authorities urged people to avoid travel due to heavy snowfall. Dozens of stranded cars and trucks were abandoned due to heavy snow in eastern Bulgaria and a train was trapped near the border with Romania. Some snow was also reported in neighboring parts of Romania.

A total of four people died on the 24th and 25th as snowstorms hit Turkey. The frozen body of 78-year-old Mehmet Aksit was found outside the small town of Akkışla in central Kayseri province after relatives reported him missing. On the 24th, Nuri Turhan, an 81-year-old Korean War veteran's corpse was found in a mountainous region of Turkey's Aydın province, where he had gotten lost walking the day before and a 75-year-old man died of hypothermia in the northwestern Turkish province of Tekirdağ.
The 4th person was found dead in a fierce snowstorm that caused power outages in Turkey and traffic chaos in neighboring Bulgaria on the 25th.

It was revealed that at least 22 people had died due to extremely cold temperatures in Romania in the last five days by January 25.

From late 2009 through early 2010, a series of massive snow and ice storms that swept the Dakotas caused a number of Indian Reservations to lose power, heat, and running water for an extended period of time. The storms were most severe in both Ziebach and Dewey counties, South Dakota. The heavy snow, ice storms and low temperatures of January 26 led to Interstate 90 being closed from Chamberlain to the Minnesota border. At nightfall on Monday the 25th, Interstate 29 was closed from Sioux Falls to the North Dakota border.

Power company officials estimated that about 7,600 customers in South Dakota and 100 in North Dakota did not have power on Monday. Some phone systems have also experienced brief telecommunications outages. Kristi Truman, director of the North Dakota Office of Emergency Management was concerned about failing water and power supplies.

Power outages began with a storm in December knocking down around 5,000 power poles, and has been accelerated by an ice storm on January 22 knocking down another 3,000 power lines on the reservation. Among the tribes of South Dakota said to be suffering from the multiple storms are the Cheyenne River Sioux, Crow Creek Sioux Tribe, Flandreau-Santee Sioux Tribe, Lower Brule Sioux Tribe, Rosebud Sioux Tribe, Sisseton-Wahpeton Oyate and Standing Rock Sioux Tribe.

"There's been winters this bad before, but not with rain so bad it freezes the power lines and snaps the poles", said Joseph Brings Plenty, the 38-year-old chairman of the Cheyenne River Sioux tribe. The worst day was on the 28th, when a Native American froze to death in his home after running out of fuel.

The reservations were further buffeted by the February 5–6, 2010 North American blizzard, which further depleted foodstocks and exacerbated the power problems.

25 Nepalese people, mostly children, died as a blizzard swept over most of Nepal on January 7. Snowstorms probably also occurred in mountainous Bhutan and Sikkim, but no reports were forthcoming.

January 28–31
On January 28, floods tore through the River Dnieper's and Prypiat River's floodplains. Climatologists from the Ukrainian Hydro-meteorological Centre warned that the 2010 spring flood could be most severe in the past 10 years and that snow packs in some regions are more than usual. They also told the Ukrainian news agency UKRINFORM that February would bring more snow. Weather forecasters said that the abnormal winter in Ukraine has seen severe snowfalls being replaced with long-lasting frosts and temperatures as low as −30 °C and the predicted flooding was an inevitability, both along the Prypiat River in the Volyn Oblast and in Ternopil Oblast and the River Dnieper in Kyiv as the snow layer is twice as high than in recent years.

A stiff frost, temperatures of −2 °C to −3 °C and a light mist occurred in Oxfordshire and western Northamptonshire, during the night as a cold front crossed the UK. Several cars crashed due to skidding on black ice.

On January 28, blizzards and severe sub-zero temperatures that have killed more than a million livestock in Mongolia would force thousands of herders to migrate to shantytowns near the capital city of Ulan Bator. Extreme winter weather that began in December and followed a hard summer drought that prevented farmers from stockpiling food for their livestock. Dangerously heavy snow and temperatures as low as −40 °C have affected 19 of Mongolia's 21 provinces, with more than 14,000 Mongolian and Chinese Red Cross volunteers across the region scrambling to deliver emergency food aid to impoverished herders who have lost nearly all their cattle.

The extreme weather had killed more than one million livestock, the herders' main source of income, according to the National Emergency Management Agency (NEMA) on the 29th. The bad weather has also reduced food security, intensified poverty and increased domestic rural-urban migration for many families. Central Dundgobi Province is one of those in the grip of a 'dzud' event (that is to say a 'major natural disaster'). A local herder named Javzmaa Batbold, a herder in Adaatsag County, Dundgobi province said that 120 of his 500 cattle had died so far. His ger (a traditional Mongolian felt and wood dwelling) was completely covered in snow, and only when the door's side cleared off did it reveal a dwelling lay underneath. The weather became rather extreme as 80 percent of Mongolia's territory was covered by snow, with depths of 20 to 90 centimeters.

The State Emergency Commission issued an appeal to Mongolia's people to launch a campaign to offer aid to herders and called for the international community to donate food, medicines and equipment as well as funds to help herders. Most cattle in Adaatsag county of Dundgovi Province (Central Gobi), Mongolia died of hypothermia on the 30th. Fuel supplies were also running low.

Snowstorms hit the east coast of the United States and the Sierra Nevada of California on the 30th and 31st.

Heavy snow fell in the German Rhineland on the 30th and 31st. Travel chaos was widespread as the snow spread into Hungary and the rest of Germany.

Heavy snow storms also hit Luxembourg on January 31.

January 30 saw heavy snow storms hit the East Coast of America.

A nor'easter dumped tons of snow over much of central and eastern parts of the United States. It then moved eastward and made a sly turn up the coast of America, and left some places with over 12 inches of snow on Saturday, January 30, 2010. Rain and floods also hit Southern California. 6 inches of rain and temperatures of 15 °C were recorded at Long Beach and L.A. on the 31st.

February

February 1–4
On February 1, the Chinese government aid arrived in Mongolia and included 10 million Yuan's (1.46 million U.S. dollars') worth of food, portable power generators and quilts. Mr. Miyeegombyn Enkhbold, Deputy Prime Minister of Mongolia and head of the State Emergency Commission, said the aid given showed an embodiment of brotherhood between China and Mongolia, and Chinese Ambassador Yu Hongyao said he was confident that Mongolians would overcome the disaster in time. It was said to be the worst snow storms in both Mongolia and Inner Mongolia in at least 30 years. The Red Cross Society of China has also announced a donation of 30,000 dollars for Mongolia, and Kazakhstan sent several hundred tonnes of food aid to the country. Mongolia formally requested aid from the United Nations on the 2nd, after the extreme cold is calculated to have killed about 3% of the nation's 44,000,000 head of cattle thus far.

On February 1, utility crews were working overtime to get power back to the 14,000 residents of Cheyenne River Sioux Reservation. The wind chill factor averaged about −25° and there was about 1-foot of snow on the ground on average.

A powerful Alberta clipper-type storm came from the north and headed towards an area of moist air left over from the previous day's thunderstorm over the Midwest on February 1, and was merging over central North America. It was estimated that it could potentially drop up to 6 inches on the Canadian Prairies and North Dakota initially and eventually add 2 more inches as it hung around overnight.

February 1 saw the earlier Californian storm track its way through northern Mexico and New Mexico. It would shortly hit the east coast and cause chaos in the Washington, D.C., Virginia and Maryland areas by the February 6.

A cyclone and heavy rain-induced floods hit the Canary islands on February 1 and 2. An unusual event dropped 82 mm of rain and flooded out 27,000 homes over a 24-hour period. Some mobile phones become inoperable due to storm-related interference and power supplies were cut overnight in some places. The average February rainfall is only 36 millimeters.

February 4 saw the worst winter in Beijing in 50 years, and the worst in Seoul in 70 years. The snow and frost activity was proving to be exceptionally bad that winter across northern India. Official reports suggest that the states of Punjab, Bihar, Haryana and Uttar Pradesh have borne the brunt of the freezing temperatures in India.

Officials at Canada's Vancouver Games were also worried about the lack of snow and frost as the city experienced its warmest January ever as the temperature never went below −2 °C. The average daily high and low for January 2010 was 9.7 and 4.3 °C at the airport, which was way above the average high of 5 °C and the average low of −1 °C for January. No snow was also recorded in January compared to an average of about 17 cm and an average snow depth of 1 cm.

The east coast had records various record low temperatures in southern states such as Georgia Alabama and Florida in the US. The eastern seaboard, had like the Western Seaboard also suffered one of the worst winters on record. An already snow bound Washington, D.C. was expected to receive up to another 20 inches of snow that weekend. Snow was also threatening the American football championship event known as the Super Bowl.

February 5–11
Power outages in both the Dakotas now covered only 100 rural electric customers and minimal numbers in Bismarck, North Dakota by February 5.

The second big snowstorm of the winter hammered the Washington, D.C. area on February 5. The El Niño phenomenon was blamed for the unusually high sea surface temperatures in the Pacific Ocean that moved east, thus pulling rainfall along with it. Normally, El Niño brings increased rainfall across the east-central and eastern Pacific, leading to drier than normal conditions over northern Australia, Indonesia and the Philippines.

The storm created historic snowfall totals in the Middle Atlantic states, rivaling the Knickerbocker Storm of 1922, as well as extensive flooding and landslides in Mexico. The blizzard stretched from Mexico and New Mexico to New Jersey, killing forty-one people in Mexico, New Mexico, Maryland, Virginia and other places along its track.

On February 6, authorities said about 4 inches of rain fell in Hollywood Hills and 3.2 inches in Santa Barbara.

The snow storms of February 6 and 7 left record levels of snow in many cities. Approximately  of snow had fallen by midday on Saturday. The mayor of Washington, D.C., and the governors of Virginia and Maryland declared states of emergency as the storm hit both Washington, D.C., Virginia, Maryland, West Virginia, Delaware, Pennsylvania and New Jersey. Amtrak canceled several trains between New York and Washington, D.C., and also between Washington, D.C. and some southern destinations. Many power outages were also reported in the city.

February 7 saw yet more major power outages in the Washington, D.C. region. At least 420,000 homes were under a blackout as the snow felled trees and cut power lines. Some 300,000 homes were without electricity in Maryland and neighboring Virginia, while Washington, D.C. was reporting an initial figure of 100,000 power outages for that day. Transport was badly disrupted from West Virginia to southern New Jersey. Washington, D.C., Virginia and Maryland have declared a short term state of emergency, allowing them to activate the National Guard in order to help cope with the storm's onslaught.

A father and daughter of McKeesport were killed by carbon monoxide poisoning after improperly using a domestic petrol generator after a power outage. On February 7 two children drowned trying to cross the swollen Chapulin River in the central state of Guanajuato, and other child deaths occurred in Angangueo, Zitácuaro, and Ocampo. In total, twenty-eight deaths in the states of Michoacán, Mexico State, and the Distrito Federal (Mexico City) in Mexico have been attributed to the storm on February 6 and 7.

On February 7, 10 people are dead in across Kandahar Province according to the Afghan Red Crescent Society (ARCS). Najibullah Barith, ARCS's director in Kandahar complained of lack of the local and national resources.

A series of avalanches caused by a storm in eastern Afghanistan killed 172 people on February 8 and 9.

On February 7, 10 people were found dead across Kandahar Province according to the Afghan Red Crescent Society (ARCS). Najibullah Barith, ARCS's director in Kandahar complained of lack of the local and national resources.

11 were killed by avalanches in Farah, Bamyan, Ghor, and Daykundi provinces between February 4 and 8, a spokesman of the Afghanistan National Disasters Management Authority said. The Afghan flash floods and avalanches left 20 others dead in the rest of the country on February 8. The provincial authorities had summoned an emergency meeting and loya Jurga to discuss responses on February 8. Both Shah Wali Kot and Shorandam districts were the worst affected. Afghanistan generally expects about 400,000 people every year, according to experts at the United Nations Office for the Coordination of Humanitarian Affairs (OCHA).

A series of avalanches caused by a storm in eastern Afghanistan killed 172 people on February 8 and 9.

The 2010 Salang avalanches consisted of a series of at least 36 avalanches that struck the southern approach to the Salang tunnel north of Kabul, Afghanistan on February 8 and 9 in 2010, burying over two miles of road, killing at least 172 people and trapping over 2,000 of travelers. They were caused by a freak storm in the Hindu Kush mountains located in Afghanistan.

Several heavy avalanches killed 15 and on a highway north of Kabul killed at least 15 and injured 55 on February 8 and 9, according to the Afghan Ministry of Public Health (MoPH). A few other avalanches and landslides also hit other parts of the snow laden Hindu Kush at this time.

Afghan Interior Minister, Hanif Atmar 24 dead were found and 40 more were feared dead. The defence minister, Abdul Rahim Wardak said 3,000 people had been trapped in vehicles along the mountain pass, that is at an altitude , but about 2,500 were rescued later that day. The road passengers got trapped in their vehicles outside of the Salang Tunnel, 9 miles north of Kabul. The International Security Assistance Force (ISAF) sent 2 helicopters to help evacuate people and drop essential supplies, a spokesman for the Afghanistan National Disasters Management Authority (ANDMA) said. Only helicopters and pack horses could get there.

A powerful Alberta clipper from western Canada and moist air from a line of thunderstorms over the mid-western United States merged over the central US on the 7th. Several inches of snow fell in both Washington, D.C. and New York City on the night of February 10 and 11.

name="thestar.co.za"></ref> The storms were dubbed "Snowmageddon", by US president Barack Obama, after an SUV in his motorcade carrying journalists was damaged by a snapped limb, injuring one person. An area all the way from Pennsylvania to New Jersey, across the BosWash corridor and south down to Virginia, was under at least  of snow. Parts of Northern Maryland had . The storm killed three people.

Snow began to fall throughout Oxfordshire, North London, and Bavaria on February 8 and 10. Heavy winds and snow flurries also hit parts of Leicestershire, Northamptonshire, in Turkey, and Amur Krai, on February 9. 1 person suffered moderate injuries after slipping on ice in one of the rural northern districts of Amur Krai. On February 10 a deep cyclone formed over the Adriatic Sea bringing heavy snowfall over large parts of Bulgaria, Serbia, Macedonia and lesser parts of Romania. Severe weather warnings have been issued in these countries. In Western Bulgaria it snowed non-stop for more than 48 hours, with up to a metre of snow accumulation in Kyustendil.

United States federal government activities were ground to a halt by the, in some places 3 ft deep, snowfall in Washington, D.C. on the 10th.

February 11 saw heavy snow east coast USA, but power workers resorted electricity supplies to 100,000 users in Maryland on February 11 and some more was predicted for the next day.

On February 11, at least  of snow fell in some areas, and strong winds caused drifting in places across Kent and East Sussex. Snow also fell in Sheffield, Berkshire, Brighton and the Grampian Mountains. Dover's coastguard helped dig out a stranded ambulance in the town. Kent County Council said all primary routes and secondary routes where possible had been gritted on Wednesday afternoon ahead of the snow showers. Kent Fire and Rescue Service said it was helping some motorists stuck in snow drifts in parts of the county including Margate, Dover and Lydd. Chief Inspector Simon Black, of Kent Police, said that all main routs were passable, but some were down to a single snow-free lane and BBC Radio Kent said that drivers should make essential journeys. Also 4 of its 4x4 vehicles were helping to transfer staff and patients to and from hospitals in Eastbourne and Hastings, in East Sussex. The exit slip road off the M20, at junction 11a, closed because of the snow. A Dover lad was moderately burnt after spilling paraffin he was trying to put into a portable domestic generator unit that day.

February 12–19
Following a storm in the southeast United States on February 12–13, snow was on the ground simultaneously in all 50 U.S. states, an event believed never to have occurred previously. Snow was confirmed in 49 states by February 13, and small patches of remnant snow on the north face of Mauna Kea in Hawai'i were confirmed soon after. The snow on February 12–13 forced the cancellation of Bi-Lo Myrtle Beach Marathon XIII after the 5k portion had been run the previous night. A record depth of 12.5 inches of snow fell within 24 hours in the Dallas–Fort Worth urban metro on the 13th. The result of the massive snowstorm led to whole school districts being shut down and over 200,000 buildings were left without power, and forced to use fire and candles to light and heat their homes. A 1 ft tall wind-induced wave swept 3 people off of various southern Californian beaches on February 14, slightly injuring one. Light snow fell in both parts of Hampshire and Fife, and heavily in the mountainous regions of Sakhalin Island on the 15th. About 1,800 out of 24,00 flights at Hartsfield Jackson Atlanta Airport were canceled on February 13. Numerous minor car accidents happened all around the Metro Atlanta area.

Moderate amounts of snow fell in Gwent and Northamptonshire on the 16th. Weather forecasters warned of more snow predicted across South East Wales and parts of Central England. Moderate snow fall was reported in both Oxfordshire, Northamptonshire, Leicestershire, the Malvern Hills, Pembrokeshire, Bristol, Aberdeenshire and Greater London on February 17 and 18. The various London Authorities warned of growing travel chaos in London on the 18th.

Over two inches of snow had fallen in part of Gwent, Pembrokeshire and Gloucestershire on the 18th. The roadways in the Gloucestershire town of Dursley had been quickly covered in snow that as a cold weather front moved over the west of the county of Gloucestershire, Chief Inspector Steve Porter, of Gloucestershire Constabulary told motorists to take care and warned that many roads including the B4221 at Gorsley and the A4136 at Longhope had had major accidents. Most of the roads would be closed due to heavy snow for the next few days. Moderate amounts of snow also fell in part of Oxfordshire and Northamptonshire on the 19th.

February 20–22
Heavy snowfall occurred in Wales and the Midlands between February 18 and 20. including in the Welsh town of Pant Glas, Gwynedd between the 18th and 20th.

Heavy snow in Ireland forced the cancellation of the National Hurling League (NHL) hurling match between Kilkenny and Tipperary at Semple Stadium in Thurles on February 20. A horse racing meeting in Naas was abandoned due to heavy snow the following day.

Light snow fell in Oxfordshire overnight on the 20th and 21st, causing minor traffic disruption. Manchester Airport was heavily disrupted late on the 20th, closed at 7.10am on the 21st, but opened later that morning after much heavy work clearing the snow off of the runways. Flights were still disrupted by midday.

A Eurostar train, with between 700,  and 800 passengers on board, broke down in Kent due to the extremely cold weather and heavy snow in the United Kingdom.

The Paris-to-London service eventually left Gare du Nord railway station in Paris two hours late at about 8.15pm UK time
after an unattended bag caused a security alert. Everything was going according to plan, until they were two minutes away from Ashford at 10.15 pm, when the train suddenly stopped, the lights flicked briefly and all power failed, leaving the victims in complete darkness at around 10.45 pm. Passengers reported that the lighting was flickering on and off in a "very spooky manner" throughout the journey, until the Eurostar suddenly stopped, and the lights finally went out completely. It then became stiflingly hot inside the train as the ventilation system shut down due to the power outage on board the stricken Eurostar train. The chaos grew when most of the toilets stopped working and the staff struggled to find emergency lighting switches. Eventually the train manager walked through all the train carriages, using his emergency torch, announcing that another train and a bus were being sent to rescue them. Passengers carrying luggage then had to clamber down ladders onto the tracks and then back up onto the rescue train that arrived alongside the failed one. The rescue train arrived at St Pancras just after 2.30am on the 22nd, more than four-and-a-half hours later than the scheduled arrival time and the bus also took a few to Ashford, where they took local trains to London. Eurostar technical spokesman, Mr. Bram Smets, said it has stopped in what he described as a "major technical problem". Eurostar has launched a probe into the breakdown which left passengers stranded for 4 hours.

Damage was confined to the southern half of the island.

About 42 people were reported dead and about 68 to 100  injured as rain-induced floods and mudslides hit the Portuguese island of Madeira on the 20th, local authorities said. The floodwaters tore down buildings, overturned cars and knocked down trees.
The local civil protection service declared that it was "overwhelmed" by emergency calls, according to a duty police officer in an interview with a journalist from the Reuters news agency. According to Portuguese media, the storms were the deadliest on the east Atlantic island since prior to October 1993, when 8 people died and 19 were injured.

The Portuguese military sent specialist rescue teams to the island of Madeira on the 21st, when it was estimated that least 38 people were known to have died in the most extreme rainstorms in 17 years as tonnes of mud and stones brought down the slopes of the island, flooding the streets of the regional capital, Funchal, and other towns. All utilities were knocked out across large swathes of the island. Ribeira Brava was also badly flooded on the 21st. Portuguese Prime Minister Jose Socrates, who was in Madeira, ordered an immediate rescue and aid mission for the island. Portuguese President Aníbal Cavaco Silva expressed his condolences in a televised statement.

A Portuguese Navy supply ship, with a helicopter, food and medical equipment was sent to the islands that lie about 900 km/560miles from the Portuguese mainland. The Island is very popular with foreign tourists. Officials from the Portuguese Department of Emergencies said that emergency teams, 56 military rescuers, search dogs and 36 firefighters were being sent to the island straight away.

The Island's authorities and the local civil protection board told CNN that one British tourist was missing. 10 British music students from a religious school in the Channel Islands were found alive in Funchal along with an Irish tourist as the city is thrown into meteorological chaos. Local authorities informed the AFP news agency that 70 people were hospitalized.

On February 22, 102 to 120 were confirmed injured and 42 were confirmed dead in Madeira. 2 British tourists were among the dead.

February 23–28
Heavy snow fell in Oxfordshire, the English Midlands and Merseyside on the 23rd and heavy snow fell in the Scottish Highlands on the 24th.

On February 24, a meteorological state of emergency was declared in 21 Mongolia's provinces due to the exceptionally cold conditions. It is purported to be the coldest snap for 50 years and that a person has already died of hypothermia.

A major winter storm started plowing its way through upstate New York, southern Vermont and Berkshire County, Massachusetts on the 23rd. Colonie, New York saw a total of 17 inches of snow. Hancock, Massachusetts had seen 9.5 inches, with the forecast total at 10–15 inches, and Stamford, Vermont had seen 9 inches.

Salem County, New Jersey was hit by heavy snow fall on the 24th, and 4 to 12 inches of snow were predicted to fall the next day by weather forecasters. Just under 1,000,000 were left without electricity in New England, Pennsylvania and New York.

On February 23, snow fell in Southeast Texas. Snow accumulated in counties north of Houston such as Conroe, Texas, which received 2 inches of snow. Huntsville, Texas had seen about 2 to 3 inches as well as College Station. Only a trace of snowfall fell in Houston, Texas.

A winter storm warning was issued for counties north of Houston, while Houston had a winter weather advisory.

The extreme winter storm spun around the Northeast by the 25th. Oneonta, New York had seen  of snow from this storm. New York City had seen , and Philadelphia had seen  of snow. Washington, D.C. and Baltimore had remained under light rain. Major flooding prevailed along coastal New England. The Shawsheen River at Wilmington, Massachusetts was at 8 feet above its banks, and the Merrimack River at Amesbury, Massachusetts was at 20 feet above banks. On Friday morning and night, most of Massachusetts, New Hampshire and Maine were without power. Sustained winds of up to 65 mph pounded the Cape Ann area of eastern Massachusetts. Wind gusts of up to 95 mph were reported in Gloucester, Massachusetts and Rockport, Massachusetts. Millions of trees were felled in the wind from Providence to Bangor. Boston received 52 mph sustained winds and 74 mph gusts. Orange County, New York saw 2 to 3 feet of snow in Montgomery and Bullville.

Widespread snowfall across Scotland brought extreme disruption. 61 cm of snow was recorded in Aviemore as hundreds of people were stranded in cars in Dunblane. Schools and transport services were disrupted. Two people died in Glencoe in an avalanche. Temperatures reached −19.2 °C in Braemar. Some people in Perthshire were stranded in their cars for 17 hours. 45,000 homes in Scotland were left without power. 30 schools were closed on the 25th.

On February 26, heavy snow hit New York and more was forecast for the next day.

On February 27, unusually heavy monsoon rains hit Haiti. 11 people died the town in Les Cayes, 3 died in the village of Torbeck,
5 died in the village of Les Cayes's Gelee as rain induced mudslides and flood waters hit them.

In January 2010, heavy rain caused flooding which buried or washed away roads and railways leading to the ancient city of Machu Picchu, trapping over 2,000 tourists in addition to 2,000 locals. Machu Picchu was temporarily closed, but it reopened on February 28, 2010. Peru's rail crew has been hard at work since then, and Machu Picchu reopened to tourists on April 1, 2010.

February 28 – March 2

Xynthia

51 were killed, 59 injured and 12 are missing in France, 6 killed in Germany, 3 killed and 2 severely injured in Spain, 1 killed in Portugal, 1 in Belgium, 1 in the Netherlands and 1 in England as heavy rainstorms hit the Bay of Biscay and central France on the 27th. Both Belgium and Denmark were hit by heavy rainstorms overnight as the windstorm moved further northeast. The storm system moved across the Massif Central into the Brittany peninsula, and areas of France bordering Belgium and Germany are on alert for heavy rain and high winds. An Italian was also injured when a hurricane-force wind capsized his yacht off the coast of Portugal. The French President Nicolas Sarkozy expressed his condolences to relatives of victims, and said that he would visit the stricken area on Monday. The French Prime Minister François Fillon said France would formally declare the storm a natural disaster, freeing up funds to help communities rebuild themselves. Rail services were severely affected in northern Spain and a number of trains in western France were delayed because of flooded tracks in southern and western France. British Airways canceled several flights and Air France said 100 of its flights had been canceled from Charles de Gaulle airport in Paris. Wind speeds hit 175 km/h at the top of the Eiffel Tower, French radio reported on the 28th. The French meteorological service said that shortly after 1700 local time (1600 GMT) the storm passed into Germany, Belgium and the Netherlands, and there also were reports of high winds in the Swiss Alps on March 1. Spain's Canary Islands, particularly La Palma, Gran Canaria and Tenerife, were also hit by the storm, although there was no great damage. The French Departments of Vendée and Charente-Maritime were in ruins and over 1 million homes lost electricity supplies. Television, radio and mobile phone service were also disrupted in some places.

On February 28, the French storms killed 7 people who drowned in various villages in the Vendée region, while 3 seniors and a child were found dead in Charente Maritime near La Rochelle. A man was killed by a falling tree branch in the south-western town of Luchon, where winds reached 90 mph. At least five other people were reported missing and dozens others injured and a kid died in Northern Portugal  5 people were missing and 1 was injured in Aytre. The French Interior Minister Brice Hortefeux declared the storm as a natural catastrophe. The Météo France meteorological service predicted the storm was by then heading towards Denmark.

March

March 1–5
It was confirmed on March 1 that 45–52 (reports vary) French people had died, and that the French government had launched an equine in to why the incident had been so disastrously mishandled. especially around La Rochelle and L'Aiguillon-sur-Mer. Nicolas Sarkozy visited the coastal town of Aiguillon-sur-Mer, the hardest hit area of France where a total 25 had died in the storm.

The 2010 Queensland floods saw inundation of the towns of Charleville, Roma, St George and Theodore among others. The floods were caused by rainfall generated by a monsoon trough described by a Bureau of Meteorology forecaster as "almost like a tropical cyclone over land". This water ran into already saturated rivers and creeks in the area. Losses from cotton crops destroyed at Theodore and the area around St George and Dirranbandi are expected to be significant.

The floods, described by the Queensland Minister for Primary Industries Tim Mulherin as the "worst flood in 120 years" are however expected to provide a billion dollar boost to the local economy, following the "worst drought since Federation" The floods have seen a large increase in the Australian plague locust population and the Australian Plague Locust Commission is concerned the locusts will head south and destroy what is expected to be a bumper winter grain crop. On March 21,

The 2010 Uganda landslide occurred in the district of Bududa in eastern Uganda on March 1, 2010. The landslide was triggered by heavy rain between 12 pm and 7 pm that day. At least 100 people were believed to have been killed.

The Ugandan Red Cross stated that rescuers had recovered 50 bodies, whilst a Ugandan government minister has put the death toll at over 100. The chairman of the eastern Bududa district suggested that the death toll could be as high as 300. The landslide struck villages on the slopes of Mount Elgon, including Nameti, Kubewo, and Nankobe. Officials and aid workers have warned that there may be further landslides, as heavy rain continues to fall in the region.

AirTran Airways canceled several flights out of Atlanta Airport due to bad weather on March 1 and 2.

On March 1, the Environment Agency issued 169 flood warnings in over East Anglia, Yorkshire, Wrexham, Tyne and Wear, Cambridgeshire, Bedfordshire, Oxfordshire, Kent and West Sussex. The Thames Barrier closed twice in less than 24 hours to protect London from a combined high tide and tidal surge in the Thames estuary, where it had been predicted that the water would rise by another 50 cm. Andy Batchelor, Tidal Area Flood Risk Manager, said that the Thames Barrier would close yet again should we need to protect the 1.25 million people living and working in London's floodplain.

On March 2, heavy snowstorms struck the Virginias and parts of Maryland.

The Ewaso Nyiro River in Kenya burst its banks and flooded a safari park's guest house on the 3rd, killing nine people.

On March 4, 20 people died in Afghanistan, when an avalanche struck 2 villages in the Wakhan Mountains.

Several dozen ships, some with nearly one thousand passengers were stranded in rapidly forming sea ice due to cold weather and strong winds in the Gulf of Bothnia, between Sweden and Finland and near the Baltic Sea. Some of the ships were freed by icebreakers on March 5.

On March 5, 20,000 people were left homeless when flood-induced landslides struck Bududa, Uganda.

March 6–20

The 2010 Victorian storms were a series of storms that passed through much of the Australian state of Victoria on March 6 and 7, 2010. One of the most severe storms passed directly over Greater Melbourne, bringing lightning, flash flooding, very large hail and strong winds to the state's capital. It was described as a "mini-cyclone".

On March 8, Catalonia saw its heaviest snowfall in 25 years; up to 50 centimeters fell in Barcelona. Over 200,000 residents of North-Eastern Spain were left without power, and up to 500 passengers were evacuated from a train traveling to Southern France, which also was experiencing blizzard conditions, with many schools closing. Nîmes and Perpignan were the worst-hit.

A state of emergency was declared in Northern Spain, on March 10, due to the unseasonal blizzards. Forty roads in France were closed with snow reportedly 3 ft deep in some areas. Italy also experienced the effects of the Arctic blast; there was traffic chaos in Siena, Assisi and Pisa, with snowstorms stretching as far south as Rome. On the sunshine island of Majorca, havoc ensued with 6 major roads closing, due to unseasonal snowfall.

On March 10, transportation and power supplies were disrupted by blizzards around Zagreb, hurricanes around Rijeka and a mixture of both in Dalmatia. Both Istria, the northern Adriatic coast and Lika, had electricity supply problems, according to Croatian Power Company (HEP).

Heavy rain and rapid snow-melt contributed to the failure of the Kyzyl-Agash dam in Kazakhstan on March 11, killing more than 40 people.

On March 12, about 4,000 people were made homeless by floods in the Kazakh towns of Almaty, Kyzyl-Agash, and Zhylbulak. A total of 30 people had been confirmed dead as the flood waters from, the dam that had burst on the 12th reached 2 meters deep on March 13.

The American military officials closed Misawa Air Base on March 10, as a blizzard swept across northern Japan, dumping a record-setting 20 inches of snow on the base by mid-afternoon. A cyclone with snowstorms approached Kamchatka coast from the Sea of Okhotsk on the 13th and preceded to move inland by the 15th, after which the storms died out in Eastern and Central Kamchatka with no casualties. The Ust-Bolsheretsk, Petropavlovsk-Kamchatsky and Yelizovo districts of Kamchatka were badly hit by the high wind and snowfall.

The fourth major winter storm to strike the East coast of the United States caused widespread flooding, severe beach erosion, and tree and structural damage from Virginia to Maine on the 13th. The storm killed at least nine people, and left over 1 million without electricity. After the storm, severe to record flooding occurred at the Pawtuxet River in Rhode Island and along the upper tributaries of the Mississippi River.

On March 16, BBC Weather reported that areas of Portugal and Spain witnessed the highest recorded levels of precipitation, since World War II.

Australia faced the worst flooding in 60 years as 134 people in the small rural town of Wanaaring, just south of the Queensland/New South Wales border, remains cut off on the 18th. The Paroo River peaked at 4.8 meters and broke its banks on the 17th.

A major sandstorm Kano in northern Nigeria on the morning of March 19. The whole federal state was filled with sandstorms. All flights into and out of the federal state were canceled amid softy fears. Similar events occurred over the border in the drought hit Niger. The Harmattan wind caused others in Mauritania. Rain fall had paradoxically gone down in the African Sahel region as it went up in most other parts of the World.

March 21–24
Cyclone Ului made landfall in southeastern Queensland on the 21st, producing heavy rains and flooding.

After nearly a month of flooding in the Croatian Kosinj Valley has been the center of about 11 million Kuna/ (1,514,000 Euros) worth of damage in the region of Lika, Croat officials said on March 22.

Heavy sandstorms hit Beijing between March 20 and 22. On March 23, a major storm sweeps of the lens west of the Bohai Sea and the Yellow Sea, and finally falls on the North Korea and South Korea. The Xinjiang, Shanxi, Shaanxi and Hebei regions were already faceing drought and sandstorms earlier this month.

A major sandstorms hit both Mauritania, Senegal, the Gambia, Guinea Bissau, Guinea and inland Sierra Leone. Another gets southern Algeria, inland Mauritania, Mali and northern Côte d'Ivoire.

A major hail storm hit Perth, Western Australia, more than 158,000 houses were blacked out at the height of the storm and estimates on the insurance damage are over a $1 billion.

March 28–31 
The UK was expecting one last shot at winter a huge snow storm is expected to drive up from the South West with rain turning to snow Midlands northwards. The UK Met Office has issued severe weather warnings for the following regions:
Northern Ireland, North West England, Wales, Yorkshire & Humber, West Midlands, S.W. Scotland, Lothian and Borders, East Midlands and North East England. Temperatures are expected to go sub zero once again. Snow is forecast from Cardiff, Wales northwards. The warnings come a day after top British meteorologists from outside the UK Met Office predicted the UK's hottest summer on record for 2010 on the 28th.

Snow fell in Scotland on March 30, stranding drivers on a motorway leaving them to dig out their cars, the MetOffice released weather alerts for only Scotland and Northern Ireland as the south wasn't as cold as forecasted however heavy snow is falling on higher ground in England and Wales, however temperatures in the South West of the UK fell dramatically around lunch time of March 30 and snow is falling in some areas in South Wales and South West England.

The Met Office updated its warnings on March 30, the following areas of the UK are in severe weather warnings; Wales, Scotland and Northern Ireland. The Met Office has also issued extreme weather warnings of Severe Blizzards, Severe Drifting Snow & Very Heavy Snowfall in Western Northern Ireland and North East Scotland where 40–50 cm of snow is now forecasted to fall with drifts over 5 feet tall. Heavy thunder storms hit parts of Hampshire and temperatures begin to rise in Southern England and Greater London.

On March 31, 48,000 Northern Irish, 24,000 Scottish and 150 Irish homes are without power as heavy snow falls in both Northern Ireland, parts of Staffordshire, and Scotland's Southern Uplands. About 300 people are freed by rescue services when 120 vehicles ventured out during a blizzard in County Londonderry's Glenshane Pass. Sadly, 17-year-old Natasha Paton, from Cleghorn in southern Lanarkshire dies as the coach she was in skids and crashes in the snow on the A73 road, outside Wiston, also in southern Lanarkshire. She was om a trip to visit Alton Towers, Staffordshire on a trip from Biggar in Lanarkshire, that was organized by Lanark Grammar School The UK Met Office has issued severe weather warnings for the next day in the following regions:Northern Ireland, Northern England, Wales and Scotland.

The storm follows the coldest winter in decades to hit the UK and this is the second most severe storm to hit the UK this year, the most severe was the January 6 snowfall in Southern England and South Wales, despite lower snow depth of 40 cm the south is less prepared and has a higher population density than Northern Ireland and Scotland so caused more chaos and damage to the UK economy. First Great Western closed both Islip railway station and Bicester Town railway station for part of the day due to heavy snow fall on exposed stretches of track. Snow also causes travel disruption for buses and cars in South Glamorgan.

Both the Rhone and the Danube begin to swell at their upper sections due to heavy rain and snow related melt water on the 31st.

April

April 1–6
On March 31, the UK Met Office issued severe weather warnings for April 1 in the following regions: Northern Ireland, Northern England, Wales and Scotland. Heavy rain fell in Banbury and moderate snow fell in Scotland on the 2nd.

April 1 and 2 had temperatures plummet to minus 50 degrees in Mongolia's Tuul valley, The peasant villager Urna said she bought "400 bundles of grass and tons of feed so that we would be ready" for any further bad weather. According to the Mongolian Red Cross have reported that about 4,500,000 head of livestock perished as a result of the bad weather this year. Tume, who lives in Ulan Bator said that he had noticed that there were several particle harsh winters in a row to. He blamed climate change, but experts said that overgrazing by cattle had also child of most of the country's grassland.

The April 2010 Rio de Janeiro floods and mudslides are an extreme weather event that has affected the State of Rio de Janeiro in Brazil in the first days of April 2010. At least 212 people have died, 161 people have been injured (including several rescuers), while at least 15,000 people have been made homeless. Meteolagists exspessed concern over the intensity of the storms and there aftermath. The worst part was on the 5th and 6th.

April 17
Two buildings suddenly fell into the River Buriganga in Nababerchar city's Kamrangirchar district during a heavy storm on April 17, 2010. Bangladeshi police claimed the foundations were weakened by illegal lifting of sand by local sand traders.

Heavy rain also hit the borders of Armenia and Azerbaijan in the evening.

April 27–28
A major snowstorm hit New England after the western side of a low pressure system sank southward from eastern Ontario on April 27, merging with part of a second low. Close to 30,000 customers were left without power.

April 28–30
Highway 2 was closed, ice coated some roads, and another  was expected to fall on Friday along with strong winds.

May

May 1–7

May 1–7: Asia
One of the hottest seasons on record was recorded in India through May, prior to the monsoon season. At least 250 people died from the country's heat wave.

A major dust storm hit New Delhi, India on May 6, 2010.

May 1–7: Europe
Heavy rain fell in western Azerbaijan on May 1. By May 2, a rain-induced landslide in Alunitdag village in Dashkasan District (western Azerbaijan) covered the yards of two smallholdings. Between May 2 and 3, two people were killed when their home collapsed in the village of Duzenli in Salyan District. It happened at about 7:45 local time. On May 5, further rain and flooding happened in most of the country's east.

Heavy rainfall in parts of Poland raised the prospect of flooding in the town of Slubice.

May 10 – July 14

The 2010 South China floods began in early May 2010. 392 people died and a further 232 people were reported missing as of June 30, 2010; this included 57 people in a landslide in Guizhou. 53 of the deaths occurred from the flooding and landslides between May 31 and June 3, and 266 deaths occurred between June 13 and 29. 424 people were killed by the end of June, including 42 from the Guizhou landslide; 118 more were killed and 47 left missing in the start of July, bringing the death toll to 542. More than 72.97 million people in 22 provinces, municipalities and regions, including the southern and central provinces of Zhejiang, Fujian, Jiangxi, Hubei, Hunan, Guangdong, Guangxi, Chongqing Municipality, Sichuan and Guizhou were affected, while at least 4.66 million people were evacuated because of the risk of flooding and landslides in the latter half of June.

May 16 – June 1

The 2010 Central European floods were a particularly devastating series of weather events that occurred across several Central European countries during May, June and August 2010. Poland was the worst affected. Austria, the Czech Republic, Germany, Hungary, Slovakia, Serbia and the Ukraine were also affected.

On May 16, in southern Serbia about 300 people were evacuated due to flooding after heavy rainfall in the country. The flooded area was left with no electricity, telephone lines, or running mains water. Two people drowned in a flooded Pčinja River.

On May 17, one person died in the Hungarian town of Miskolc, while two others died in the Serbian town of Trgovište due to flooding created by heavy rainfall.

May 20–26

May 20–26: Americas
Heavy rain began to fall in Guatemala City on the 24th, causing local rivers to flood. Heavy rain was also reported in parts of Mexico, Honduras, and southwestern Brazil.

As the storm moved inland, torrential rains triggered flash flooding and landslides in parts of Honduras on May 30. At least 45 homes were destroyed and one person was killed in the country. On May 31, the presidents of both El Salvador and Honduras declared a state of emergency for their respective countries. Tropical Storm Agatha had picked up speed and strength over the Central American state of Belize, in the Atlantic basin, on May 31.

May 20–26: Asia
The 2010 Indian heatwave was a period of extremely hot weather occurring during the summer of 2010 in India and much of South Asia. Said to be the harshest summer since 1800, the heat wave killed hundreds of people due to heat exhaustion and food poisoning.

On May 24, 400 people held a protest in the 1,500-strong village of Altit over the lack of aid provision, following a visit to the settlement by Pakistan's Prime Minister. One protestor said he was sheltering in a Gilgit school building and that there were too few doctors in the camp. The only reliable means of transport in the disaster zone was by Army helicopter. About 32 villages in the Hunza–Nagar District were said by the local administration to be flooded.

By May 27, after temperatures higher than  hit areas across the country, at least 18 people died in Pakistan from the heat.

May 20–26: Europe
Warsaw faced imminent rain-related flooding as the Vistula river burst its banks and inundated many nearby villages on May 20.

The Vistula river burst its banks on May 21 and flooded nearby towns. Warsaw was put on flood alert. 23,000 people were displaced in the worst Polish floods in 160 years. EU officials said Poland would receive 100 million euros in aid from the European Union solidarity fund. The Vistula was at a 160-year high and £2,000,000 worth of damage was done in Poland. Austria, Hungary, the Czech Republic, Slovakia and Poland all witness heavy rainfall, as rivers begin to swell in Slovenia and eastern Germany.

On May 23, the floods hit the city of Wrocław as the Ślęza river broke a dyke and flooded into the Kozanow neighborhood. The Vistula River reached  in height and, like the floods in general, was at a level not seen in 60 years.

On May 24, levees failed or were tactically dynamited, southern Poland was hopelessly flooded, and the River Oder began to flood Germany. $2,500,000,000 worth of damage was done in Poland as the river Vistula flooded along its entire length and Poland's death toll reached 15.

By May 25, another £400,000,000 worth of damage was done and 15 Poles were reported dead. Flooding also affected nearby parts of Germany.

Parts of Lower Austria, the Polish town of Slubice and the German city of Frankfurt an der Order started to be flooded from the rivers Spree and Oder on May 27 due to heavy rain. Heavy rain fell across the English Midlands.

May 20–26: Middle East
A large dust storm swept across both Libya and Egypt on May 26.

May 27–30
On May 30, Guatemalan President Alvaro Colom declared a ‘state of calamity’ as the first tropical storm of the Eastern Pacific hurricane season, Hurricane Agatha flooded about 600 homes and killed 12 people the day after a volcanic eruption. The rain made the volcanic ash set like concrete on and around Guatemala City and the city's main airport. A total of thirteen people had already died in El Salvador the day before. In El Salvador, one person drowned when a river flooded, according to civil protection agency spokesman Armando Vividor. People living in or traveling to flood zones in the capital and five other cities were to relocate to shelters, according to a statement on the civil protection agency's website.

June

June 1–6

June 1–6: Americas
On June 1, the National Hurricane Center stated that the remnants of Tropical Storm Agatha had only a low chance of regeneration in the western Caribbean Sea. By the next day, the thunderstorm activity associated with Agatha in the western Caribbean had dissipated and it was only a bad storm. The storm had severely damaged Guatemala's principal airport with rain induced floods. It also resulted in the death of 1 person in Nicaragua, 152 people killed and 100 left missing in Guatemala (due to landslides), 13 deaths in El Salvador and 16 fatalities in Honduras. On June 6, the remnants of Agatha dissipated completely, after hitting Honduras.

June 1–6: Asia
25 died between June 2 and 4 in a heavy rainstorm in Pakistan's Punjab Province and a blizzard hit the Pakistani-held parts of Jammu and Kashmir.

June 1–6: Europe
On June 2, police in the Czech Republic warned of vehicles’ aquaplaning after a man died in a flooded street due to it. In Slovakia, a 38-year-old man died searching for another man who had fallen into a swollen river. 2,000 people were evacuated in the northern Hungarian town of Paszto. Major flood alerts hit Serbia and Bosnia as their rivers swelled with floodwater. Government officials in Serbia said the situation was "critical". A Croatian drowned in a flooding Istrian river. The Croatian government sent 5,000  bottles to the Zupanja region, and the Croatian Red Cross launched an emergency appeal. Meanwhile, there was more rain in Croatia and Slovenia. On June 2, several heavy thunderstorms also hit the high Swiss Alps, accompanied by heavy snow in some places.

The Hungarian flood level was critical on June 5.

June 1–6: Middle East
The  Cyclone Phet hit Oman's Masirah Island after 1,000 Omanis and 50,000 Pakistanis were evacuated on June 4. (Phet is a Thai word meaning diamond.)

June 1–6: Oceania
A waterspout unexpectedly moved onshore as a tornado at Lennox Head, New South Wales, Australia on June 3. 40–100 houses were damaged, and several people were injured by the tornado.

June 6–8
June 6 saw heavy rain hit the sun-scorched UK and Ireland.

On June 7, 150 Polish schools were closed, flood hit Slovakia received 25,000,000 Euros ($30,000,000) in EU aid, and river levels in Budapest reached . The death toll included 1 Hungarian, 3 Slovaks, and 25 Poles.

The Polish towns of Wilkow and Winiary flooded. The river level in Warsaw reached  and a local dam collapsed, flooding part of the city on June 8. The Polish city of Sandomierz was cut off by flooding.

On June 8, heavy thunderstorms hit the British Isles, ending the 6-day-long heat wave.

June 13–17

June 13–17: Asia
About 42 people were killed by heavy monsoon-related landslides, winds and flash floods in the south of Bangladesh on June 15. Some flooding was also reported in India's Tamil Nadu and West Bengal provinces.

June 13–17: Europe
At least 1,000 people were evacuated and spent the night in empty schools or other temporary shelters, and some 175,000 houses were estimated to have been left without power as rescue teams moved 436 prisoners from a flooded jail in Draguignan. The rain was worst in Roquebrune-sur-Argens and Frejus; it continued into June 17. Both rail and air travel in the region were interrupted, with 300 or so passengers who were traveling on a high-speed train between Nice and Lille trapped by floodwater spilling over the tracks near Nice. The railway line between Toulon and Frejus was closed until the morning of June 17, due to water-induced subsidence of the track and debris on the line. Fallen trees and landslides also blocked many roads for the next 24 hours. Meteorologists said it was the worst such event in the region since 1827. The ultimate death toll was 22.

June 21–30

June 21–30: Americas
On June 21, the Salvadoran Red Cross Society said the El Salvador flood emergency appeal funds were nearly exhausted.

The price of oil rose to $77 per barrel on June 24 as a cyclone began to form in the south-western Caribbean.

On June 30, Hurricane Alex hit north-eastern Mexico.

June 21–30: Asia

The rain-swollen Gan River burst its banks and flooded Zhangshu, Jiangxi, China on June 21.

June 27 to 29 saw the heaviest rainfall for 300 years in the Luolou township of the Chinese Guangxi Zhuang Autonomous Region. 6,673 people were affected; the town was cut off, schools were closed, and people traveled by boat.

On July 30, Malteser International, the relief service of the Order of Malta, gave disaster relief to about 10,000 in the flood-ravaged Swat District of Pakistan. The Khyber Pakhtunkhwa saw at least 400,000 people affected by the floods, which were the most severe ones since 1929. The abnormally heavy rain killed 300 Pakistanis and a cholera epidemic was expected in its wake.

June 21–30: Europe

Heavy rainfall happened in central and north-eastern Romania between June 22 and 29.

1,870 people were evacuated from 10 villages in Suceava county, as the river Siret threatened to overflow on the afternoon of June 28. Some 1,100 sheep were moved to higher ground in the mostly rural region. Refugees were taken by local monasteries, schools, cultural centers, and relatives. Gheorghe Flutur, president of Suceava county, said his region was one of the worst hit in the country. Later that day, the Siret threatened to break through the dikes protecting the town of Șendreni, as locals and emergency services reinforced the dikes with sandbags by the truck-full to prevent the river from breaking out and flooding the town.

Several roads into Dorohoi remained either washed away or under water. Ten people were killed by the floods in total. The railway line to the Ukraine, electricity pylons, bridges, and roads were damaged across northern and eastern Romania.

The Romanian counties of Alba, Arad, Bacău, Botoșani, Brașov, Cluj, Hunedoara, Iași, Mehedinți, Neamț, Olt, Prahova, Sălaj, Sibiu, Suceava, Timiș, Tulcea, Vâlcea, and Vrancea were flooded in late June. Botoșani, Suceava, and Tulcea counties took the brunt of the damage. Also affected was Chernivtsi province in the neighboring Ukraine.

On June 29 and 30, Romanian Prime Minister Emil Boc toured the devastated regions in the north-east of the country. Romanian Interior Minister Vasile Blaga told parliament that the losses were equivalent to 0.6% of GDP. Moldova and the Ukraine had yet to assess the crisis in their flooded regions. Russia gave  of humanitarian aid to the Ukraine.

On July 9, the European Union's Humanitarian Aid and Civil Protection representative, Kristalina Georgieva, let Belgium send aid to Romania. The fortnight-long floods in Rumania killed 23–24 people, injured 43, made 7,000–18,000 homeless, and caused 60,000,000 Euros (US$76,000,000) of damage. Romania is part of the EU's Civilian Solidarity Mechanism. One Ukrainian was killed by the floods in the Ukraine's Chernivtsi region.

July

July 2–9

July 2–9: Americas
On July 2, 2010, Hurricane Alex made landfall in Monterrey, Mexico, causing flooding in most of northern Mexico and killing 2 people.

July 2–9: Asia
Unusually heavy rain hit Phnom Penh, causing transport chaos. The chief of Phnom Penh Municipality's sewage system department said that several hours of rain had overwhelmed the city's drains and flooded most streets.  of rain fell on June 2.

On July 7, 2010, five people died and eight were missing after torrential rains caused flash floods in Huangyuan County, in China's overheating Qinghai Province. The rain hit six towns at about 10 pm and lasted for about 40 minutes that night. It triggered floods that cut transport links, phone, power, and water supplies. Over 80 homes collapsed and 770 were flooded. Disaster relief operations were under way during the heavy flooding, but the county government was still assessing the full losses and financial implications of the heat wave and flash flood. Rumors that a homeless old man had been crushed to death in a partly collapsed house were denied by rescue workers.

July 8 saw the highest temperature across the People's Republic of China so far in the summer of 2010, along with heavy rainstorms. Local authorities and the National Meteorological Center also issued an orange flood alert in central and southwest China; the worst floods for 40 years hit these regions. Part of the floods in southeastern Sichuan province was sewage from a failed sewer.

Anhui saw 10-year flood and 50-year temperature records, the latter increasing both air-conditioner sales and electricity consumption in Beijing and nearby cities. Both the Golmud River and the Wenquan reservoir overflowed.

July 8 saw the Indian states of Haryana, Punjab, and Himachal Pradesh flooded and arterial highways connecting Delhi to northern towns cut or directly threatened with flooding. Delhi-Manali National Highway 21 remained closed for a second day after water from the rain swollen Beas river flooded in several places near Aut.

A  breach opened up in the rain-swollen Sutlej Yamuna link canal and two army columns were deployed for rescue and evacuation missions in the disaster zone. The overflowing Ghaggar-Hakra River also flooded Punjab's Patiala district, killing three people.

July 2–9: Europe
As the floods eased in Central Europe and the Balkans, except for in Romania, temperatures began to climb across Western Europe and the UK between June 30 and July 2.

On July 2 Brussels saw its hottest day since 1976. France, Germany, and the Spanish resort Benidorm had record temperatures as part of Europe's July heat wave. Several heavy thunderstorms hit the low Swiss Alps, accompanied by heavy sleet in some places.

On July 3 a heat wave hit parts of Ryazan province and the cities of Bucharest and Budapest, killing a Romanian man with heatstroke. Heavy thunderstorms hit the high Swiss Alps, accompanied by heavy snow in some locations.

July 10–14

July 10–14: Asia

On July 11, heavy floods hit Haryana in India and damaged the archaeological site of Jognakhera, where ancient copper smelting had been found dating back almost 5,000 years. The Indus valley civilization site was hit by almost  of water as the Sutlej Yamuna Link Canal overflowed.

July 10–14: Europe
A thunderstorm with heavy rain hit Zürich and the Swiss-French border on July 10. The storm also threatened to close the Avoriaz stage of the Tour de France cycle race.

On July 11, temperatures skyrocketed in Vienna, Berlin, Munich, Amsterdam, Madrid, Lisbon, Zürich, and Bucharest. More heavy thunderstorms hit the high Swiss Alps, accompanied by heavy snow in some places.

On July 12, France and Belgium also saw record temperatures.

Alpine and North Sea thunderstorms swept across south-east and north-west Germany respectively. Heavy rain fall was also reported in parts of the Netherlands, Ireland, Normandy and the English Midlands on July 13.

Thunderstorms hit the English Midlands, Oxfordshire, Ireland, and Northern Ireland. The heatwave ended in the British Isles and north-west Europe.

Heavy storms also hit Warsaw, Vienna and Kyiv between July 14 and 16.

July 10–14: Middle East
Heavy rain and thunderstorms hit the town of Samail in Oman's northern coastal mountain range on July 14. On that day, heavy rain also fell in most of Iran's East Azerbaijan and West Azerbaijan provinces.

July 15–22

July 15–22: Americas
The 2010 Milwaukee flood was a series of two disasters in the Milwaukee, Wisconsin area of the United States; they happened from July 15 to 23, 2010.

Iowa, Wisconsin, Minnesota, Texas, Kansas and Nebraska had heavy thunderstorms with a bad tornado in Northfield, Minnesota on July 16. Later in the day all of Manitoba, Nebraska, Kansas, Missouri, Tennessee, Mississippi, Wisconsin, and Minnesota had heavy storms. The heat wave was at last dead and blown away by the storms.

Flash flooding in Arizona swept a 12-year-old girl to her death on July 20, 2010.

July 15–22: Europe
The 2010 Var floods were the result of heavy rainfall in southern France that caused severe floods in the Var department in the evening of July 15, 2010. As well as generalized flooding, there were also flash floods. At least 25 people were killed, and 14 people were missing.

Trees and chimney pots fell as  winds hit parts of Wales and the Bristol Channel area, between July 15 and 16. The winds hit Cardiff, Porthmadog, Pontcanna Fields near Cardiff, coastal Pembrokeshire, southern Monmouthshire, Cheltenham, Gloucester, Aberystwyth, Portmeirion, and Prenteg as heavy gales passed over South Wales and the Bristol Channel.

July 15–22: Asia
On July 15, the regional representative of the American Red Cross had praise for the Chinese people, the Chinese Red Cross, and China's Ministry of Civil Affairs for their efforts in fighting the flood. The People's Liberation Army (PLA) was praised for sending contingents of soldiers across the country to any location where a disaster had struck.

Both the Xinjiang region in the northwest and Yunnan province in the south were affected by flooding. In all, flood waters inundated parts of at least 24 of China's 34 provinces and regions on July 20. By July 20, the Yangtze River at the Three Gorges Dam experienced its highest river discharge in 130 years, and the highest since the dam was built.

It was officially revealed on July 21 that more than 701 people were dead, and that 347 were missing due to the severe flooding in China so far; the floods caused the highest death toll since 1998, which saw the highest water levels in 50 years. The floods have affected 100 rivers, 117 million people in 27 provinces, and seven cities.  of farmland and 645,000 houses have been destroyed, and 8,000,000 people have been evacuated (about the population of New Jersey).

The overall damage totaled 142,200,000,000 Yuan or £13,700,000,000. The Three Gorges Dam project prevented floods like those in 1998, which killed several thousands. The shipping channels in the Three Gorges Dam were closed, but the dam wall was still holding for the time being.

July 25–31

About 70 people were killed and 100,000 left homeless between July 19 and 25 in flash floods in Pakistan's south-western Baluchistan province.

Due to the bad weather, an Airblue passenger jet crashed into the Margalla Hills outside Islamabad killing all 152 passengers on July 28.

Heavy rainfall was reported all over the Hindu Kush mountains. 80 died in Khyber Pakhtunkhwa province, mostly in the Swat Valley.

An unnamed river flooded the town of Behrain, destroyed a hotel, and caused heavy damage.

A recently built part of a dam in the Charsadda District collapsed; the ensuing wave killed two people and destroyed all the local farms.

On July 31, the information minister of Pakistan's northwestern Khyber-Pakhtoonkhwa province, Mian Iftikhar Hussain, said the latest deaths were in this region. Eight hundred died and thousands had diarrhea, fever and other waterbourne illnesses. About 45 bridges were destroyed in the worst floods since 1928; this severely hampered rescuers, who lacked helicopters.

On July 31, Peshawar in Pakistan was cut off and Pakistani-held parts of Kashmir were also flooded, while the abnormally strong monsoon killed 65 people in mountainous areas across the border in Afghanistan. The EU pledged to give €30,000,000 to Pakistan in aid supplies. 1600 were confirmed dead in Pakistan by the end of August and 60 were dead in Afghanistan by July 31. All 300,000 people in Peshwar were cut off by the flood waters, but helicopters were still able to land there, according to a Khyber-Pakhtoonkhwa provincial official (Mian Iftikhar Hussain). It remained so on August 1, 2010.

August

August 1–2

August 1–2: Asia
On August 1 floods occurred in south-east Afghanistan and continued in the Indus Valley. 1,100–1,400 Pakistani people had been killed and 27,000–30,000 were trapped on high ground, clinging to rooftops and trees. India also suffered substantial dislocations of its road network as rescue workers used boats and helicopters in both nations. There were 900 cases of water-carried illness in Pakistan; the town of Nowshera was flooded.

The rain continued to fall on parts of Pakistan, Afghanistan, and Iranian Baluchistan, and snow blanketed the Pamir Mountains and Ladakh on August 2. About 2,500,000 Pakistanis were now homeless according to the International Red Cross and Mian Iftikhar Hussain said there might be a cholera epidemic in his Khyber Pakhtunkhwa province.

August 1–2: Europe

Some 4,000 soldiers were called in to help fight both the 6 rumored and several known fires in the Moscow Oblast. Over 5,000 people were evacuated from their homes and Vladimir Putin organized an emergency meeting for August 2 with the governors of the various regions in the Central and Southern Federal Districts devastated by the fires. The grain harvest in the disaster zone was destroyed.

August 6–11

August 6–11: Americas

August 6–11: Asia
August 7 in China had 700 people known to have been killed and more than 1,000 people still missing and presumed dead as landslides demolished hundreds of buildings, including several seven stories high buildings in the remote Zhouqu county of Gansu province after several days of heavy rain in the county.

The worst floods for a decade killed over 2,100 and millions more were displaced nationwide.

A report compiled by Lanzhou University in 2006 had warned that the felling of the forests around Zhouqu for coal mining and agriculture would cause heavy soil erosion and destabilize hillsides. The construction of a major highway and more than 40 hydroelectric dam and recovery systems in the steep valleys acted to further destabilize the local geology, according to leading Chinese geologist Fan Xiao.

The rain stopped on August 10 and the situation became less chaotic as the army and fire-fighters continued to look for survivors.

August 10 saw China's state-run Xinhua news agency report that the authorities sent nearly 3,000 soldiers and about 100 medical experts to help in search and rescue effort in the Gannan and Tibetan Autonomous Prefectures in Gansu province after record floods hit the province. Reports said Zhouqu county had at least 337 dead as rescuers searched for up to 1,148 others who were still missing. Landslides up to five stories deep buried three villages, destroyed roads and bridges, disrupted mobile telecommunications equipment, and cut phone lines, water, and electricity supplies in parts of the region.

The Chinese government sent experts by helicopter to survey the flooding in devastated villages, and examine how to blast open the remaining flood-induced blockages at the end of the valley, according to Chinese state television. In total, about 875,000 homes were destroyed, 9,610,000 million people were evacuated,  of crops were destroyed, and tens of billions of dollars in damage were caused by the floods in 28 provinces and regions.

The storms in north-east Jilin province also killed several people and left more than 100 people missing; heavy snowfall was reported in the Himalayas.

August 6–11: Europe
August 8 had heavy rainfalls in southwest Kosovo, killing an elderly man, who fell into a swollen river on the Albania/Kosovo border.

August 13–29

August 13–29: Africa

On August 20 the worst floods for 80 years hit Africa's Sahara Desert region. The UN warned that Niger, Chad, Burkina Faso, Cameroon and northern Nigeria were also in the grip of the worst regional food crisis since 2006. In the Sudanian Savanna city of Kano, Nigeria, over 2,000 families were displaced by floods, and in the nearby Jigawa region, an entire village was evacuated due to heavy flooding. A Mauritanian child was swept away in a flood that damaged bridges and many homes in the mountain town of Aioun. Heavy flooding happened around parts of Lake Chad.

August 13–29: Europe
After weeks without rain, heavy downpours soaked Moscow and nearby areas, bringing further relief for the extended heat wave. Earlier in August, radioactive and explosive materials were moved out of the facility due to the threat of forest fires; however, they were later returned when the threat lessened. Over 3,400 fire-fighters battled the forest blaze, assisted by a special fire-fighting train. The front end of the forest peat fire-fighting came near the town of Roshal (in the Shatursky district) at one point on August 13.

Heavy rain and thunder storms hit the British Isles between August 13 and 22, leading to heavy flooding in parts of Sussex, Oxfordshire and Buckinghamshire. The low cloud and rain led to the closure of the Bournemouth Air Festival on August 21 and 22. The morning of August 23 saw heavy storms hit Pembrokeshire, the English Midlands and Argyll. Some flooding was reported in Oxfordshire and Pembrokeshire. As the day went on the storms lined up on the east coast between The Wash and Aberdeen, with isolated storms in south-west Gloucestershire, Oxfordshire, south Cambridgeshire, south-west Yorkshire, Leicestershire, and Moray.

September

September 1–7

September 1–7: Africa

On September 1, floods hit the Niger River. Flooded ruins were all that was left of three districts of the West African country's capital Niamey (Zarmagandaye, Lamorde and Karadje) It was the worst flooding by the Niger recorded since 1929.

September 1–7: Americas
September 4 saw a landslide killing 12 people by hitting a bus, as record amounts of rain started falling in parts of Guatemala and south-eastern Mexico. Thousands were evacuated from the Mexican Gulf coastline by the state of Tabasco, as the flooding continued to grow.

September 5 saw up to 100 people trapped in a bus by a landslide as torrential rains continued to swamp parts of Guatemala. Most were rescued, but 18 people were killed in the incident.

On September 6, the region's first major tropical storm of the year killed at least 145 people in Guatemala, with at least 53 missing and thousands homeless as emergency crews struggled to reach isolated communities. Tropical Storm Agatha washed away hundreds of roads and collapsed many bridges in the country. The Chimaltenango department's governor, Erick de Leon, said that the landslides buried dozens of small rural Amerindian communities and killed at least 60 around the local village of Santa Apolonia alone. Local volunteers worked desperately to recover the bodies of two brothers, aged four and eight, who were buried by a landslide in the village of Parajbei.

September 6 also saw an overnight landslide (caused by a flood) burying around 100 people who were trying to rescue victims of the previous bus trapped by a landslide along the Inter-American Highway in the Guatemalan Highlands. 23 people were killed in the incident near the town of Santa Maria Ixtaguacan, and 12 had died in the original landslide. The floods were estimated by the government to have killed 45 people on the highway so far, with 38 dying over the last two days of heavy rain and landslides far. President Alvaro Colom declared a nationwide state of emergency and urged that citizens to stay off the nation's highways due to the likelihood of more landslides. The week-long heavy rain and floods affected some 40,000 people in the country and caused $350–500 million in damage. He also warned that 24,000 more people were at risk and the government was running out of funds.

Thousands more fled their homes in Honduras after mudslides and landslips killed 15 on September 6. State officials warned people to stay away from any swollen waterways as the rain-swollen reservoirs behind two dams near the capital of Tegucigalpa overflowed the dam walls' ramparts and spilled into a nearby river.

Meanwhile, a weather forecast of yet more rain was issued across Central America; it prompted officials in Mexico to take precautions against rain induced landslides. Heavy flooding made thousands homeless in the southern Mexican states of Veracruz, Tabasco, Chiapas and Oaxaca. Mexican president Felipe Calderón pledged to send aid to the devastated regions on his Twitter page.
Mexico's national power company opened floodgates on some hydroelectric dams in the region, worsening the flooding in some low-lying areas but causing no deaths and avoiding a catastrophic dam burst situation.

September 1–7: Asia
The Pakistan government said on September 2 that 1,500 had died across Pakistan so far. Basera (near Muzaffargarh in Punjab province), Jatti (near Thatta in Sindh province, Pakistan), and Larkana (in Sindh province) were still in chaos and choked with refugees on September 2. The United Nations warned that up to 3,5000,000 children were at risk from water-borne diseases like cholera in the disaster areas and refugee camps.

The Oxford mosque's Pakistan flood charitable fund reached £30,000 on September 4, 2010.

On September 5 floods hit the squalid refugee camps in Azakhel, miles from Peshawar, Pakistan.

On September 4 storms swept into the prefecture-level city of Luoyang in China's Henan province at 7 am. A total of 15 villages were hit by gales, hail, flood and heavy rain. Several small boats were sunk in a river running through a local scenic spot in Luoyang. One person was reported dead, and electricity poles and telecommunication links were cut down in some villages as well as three bridges destroyed, farm crops destroyed, and several roads blocked, causing about 900,000,000 Yuan or $132,000,000 in material losses.

September 1–7: Europe
A second day of heavy rain hit the UK on September 6. The rainfall was much above average in both south-east England and Wales, and the third-wettest August on record had happened in East Anglia; over twice the average August rainfall occurred in 2010.

September 1–7: Oceania
The 2010 Victorian floods were a widespread series of flood events across the Australian state of Victoria from September 2 to 7. Heavy rainstorms hit New Zealand's South Island on September 2; the same rain system then hit Victoria in Australia. Flooding followed heavy rain across south-eastern Australia and caused the inundation of about 250 homes, hundreds of evacuations, and millions of dollars of damage. Weather warnings were initially issued for Victoria on Thursday, September 2 and rain began to fall on that Friday, continuing through the weekend to Tuesday, September 7. Heavy rain fell in most regions of the state, particularly higher altitudes in the state's west and north-east, flooding the upper reaches of many of Victoria's major rivers. A state of emergency was declared with State Emergency Service crews arriving from Queensland, South Australia, and Tasmania. In Skipton in the state's Western District, 20 properties were put on evacuation alert, while in the Central Highlands 120 people sought refuge in the town hall at Creswick and 30 people were evacuated from a caravan park in Clunes. In northern Victoria, 150 extra police and 50 military personnel were deployed to assist with evacuations and sandbagging.

September 8–23

Although Hurricane Igor was several hundred miles from the Leeward Islands on September 9, large swells produced by Igor swept two people out to sea in the U.S. Virgin Islands and Puerto Rico.

Since the storms started on September 9, 144 people were killed and 13,000 affected people were moved to temporary relief shelters. Five of El Salvador's fourteen departments were still seeing heavy rainfall. More than 20 homes were destroyed, 24 bridges and 1,600 houses were damaged, as the town of San Vicente ( east of San Salvador) was buried under landslides on November 11, killing several people.

Mexico experienced its worst rainy season on record starting beginning on September 10. Mexico's President Felipe Calderón said that 900,000 people were affected in the latest tropical storms. It was the worst such event since Hurricane Alex killed 22 and left 40,000 homeless in July 2010.

September 14–18

September 14–18: Asia
A record cloudburst hit northern India on September 18 and 19, causing deadly flooding.

September 14–18: Europe
The 2010 Slovenian floods on the weekend of September 17–19 were caused by heavy rains in Slovenia, resulting in one of the worst floods in the country's history. Among the regions affected were the capital Ljubljana, the Central Sava Valley, Laško, the Slovenian Littoral and the Lower Carniola region. Initial damage was estimated to reach €15 million. Three people were killed.

On September 17, north-east England's firefighters, medics and emergency rescue teams did flood and rainstorm related training exercises at Hurworth Burn Reservoir, near Middleton St George in County Durham, as well as at Rothbury and Otterburn in Northumberland.

Three Spaniards died as heavy rains hit southern Spain on September 17. A man died when a wall collapsed in Bujalance in eastern Córdoba province, while a man and a woman died in Aguilar de la Frontera in the south of the province. Storm warnings were announced by the national weather authority later in the day.

September 14–18: Oceania
Heavy rainstorm and snowstorms hit Invercargill, New Zealand on September 16 and 17.

The NZ Transport Agency said State Highway 1 between Woodlands and Edendale in Southland had reopened after the ending of heavy snowfalls. Heavy floods under railway overbridge closed the highway near Marton, forcing a local diversion.

Powerco restored supply to around 28,000 customers as a severe wind and rain storm continued to pound the North Island. The storm had caused power cuts to around 45,000 customers through the middle of the North Island; the worst affected areas were Thames, Coromandel, Thames-Coromandel, Tirau and Putaruru, parts of the western Bay of Plenty, parts of Whanganui, Wairarapa, and Manawatu, Hauraki-Piako, and parts of Taranaki.

Overnight between September 17 and 18, snow and ice settled on Southland's roads causing slippery conditions on rural roads and treacherous conditions in Invercargill as the local police asked people to stay indoors and off the roads. An autistic 7-year-old boy nearly died after falling in Paeroa, and hundreds of cars were damaged or destroyed nationwide. Sheep died in the worst winter since 1996.

The MetService reported more than 100 lightning strikes in the Hutt Valley and Wairarapa region yesterday, setting fire to a shed and igniting several trees early in the day.

The electricity supply line company Vector believes about 30,000 people lost power in the Auckland area and in Piha to the west of the city.

September 19–22

September 19–22: Americas
Bermuda closed government-run schools for September 20 and 21 in anticipation of Hurricane Igor. In addition to school closures, the Bermuda International Airport (BDA) was shut down in advance of the storm. During the storm, the major causeway leading to the airport was shut down earlier than anticipated due to the threat of tornadoes.

Despite initial fears that Hurricane Igor would cause immense damage across Bermuda, the storm passed after causing relatively minimal structural damage. Although roughly 27,500 of the 35,000 residences across the island were without power, the damage was limited mainly to downed trees. No reports of loss of life or serious injuries came after the storm's passage. Officials in Bermuda stated that the biggest loss from Igor would be lessened tourism revenue following a mass exodus prior to the hurricane's arrival. Catastrophe modeler AIR Worldwide indicated that insured losses in Bermuda were less than $100 million.

September 19–22: Asia
September 19 saw thirteen more people perish in Uttar Pradesh because of the Yamuna river floods. Several food prices rose because of the destroyed farmland.

Uttar Pradesh Chief Minister Mayawati demanded that a national government team be sent to assess the losses suffered during the floods. After taking an aerial survey of the flood-hit areas, she requested that the national government provide  2,175 crore for a flood relief team.

Not much happened in Pakistan on September 19, but the victims of the Pakistan flood struggled to rebuild on their own. People swarmed around any cars, begging for help: their homes and everything were completely destroyed; their fields were turned into rubbish. One villager said "[n]obody has visited our village. Nobody has helped us. My house, my furniture & and everything else was destroyed. We had no support from the government."

On September 20, heavy rain and landslides inflicted a death toll of 63 in Uttarakhand; Naintal lost 11, Haridwar 7 and Pauri 3. The state-run rescue operation to the region said that seven people were still trapped under the debris of flattened houses; local volunteers and police were already there. All the schools in the province were closed for three days. Uttarakhand's Chief Minister, Ramesh Pokhriyal Nishank, requested further help from both the Bharatiya Janata Party leader, Sushma Swaraj, and the Indian prime minister.

On September 22, the Yamuna river flooded the Yamuna Sports Complex and left mosquito-attracting pools of floodwater, further disrupting preparations for the Commonwealth Games.

September 19–22: Europe
On September 22, in the morning after a night of steady rainfall Strathclyde Fire and Rescue received 117 calls about flooding in Kilbirnie, Glengarnock, Fairlie, and Largs in North Ayrshire, Scotland. There were similar downpours in parts of Northumberland and Cumbria at the same time as the Scottish floods took place. At one point later on September 22, 65 firefighters were called to flooding in the Rothesay and Helensburgh areas of Argyll and Bute. Just after 9:00 pm on September 22, a storm-weakened wall collapsed over the Glasgow to Largs main railway line near Pencil View in Largs, forcing Network Rail to close the line.

September 19–22: Oceania
On September 19 the roof of the 2,000 seat Stadium Southland tennis stadium in Invercargill, New Zealand collapsed and imploded after a storm dumped a near-record amount of snow on it during a tennis match. A tennis player narrowly evaded death when the air pressure's shock wave hit him as he loitered outside the stadium's entrance. In contrast, in Christchurch the weather was sunny and bright, with a temperature of  not .  near Woodlands, Invercargill and Edendale was closed after a Fonterra truck jackknifed. Fonterra had difficulty picking up milk from some areas due to tanker trucks jack-knifing on the roads; 400 farmers dumped their milk for hygiene reasons as it began to ferment and mold. The airport was closed and Air New Zealand crews were sent home. Overnight snowfalls hit Lumsden and Queenstown for the second night running.

The morning of September 20 saw roof collapses from heavy snow of the Wren building and neighboring retailer Briscoes in Yarrow St, Invercargill.

Heavy snow destroyed a  glasshouse at Eldon Gardens, Donald McDonald's drive in Tweed St, killing 2,000 young tomato plants. The weight of the snow buckled the metal support poles of the glasshouse and most of the eight bays collapsed. The NZ$100,000 glass house was 18 years old.

September 23–25

September 23–25: Asia
September 23 saw northern India's storm devastating railways with 22 Delhi (inbound and outbound) trains canceled and another 65 diverted due to the severe flooding in Delhi as the river Yamuna reached the  danger mark. The Old Yamuna Bridge between East Delhi and New Delhi was closed for safety reasons as the Yamuna river's level rose menacingly. Residents in low-lying areas were evacuated to shelters in New Delhi.

The Yamuna river reached a record high above the  danger mark in the worst monsoon rains for 30 years, leaving mosquito-attracting pools and coming dangerously near the Taj Mahal; more water was discharged from the Gokul and Okhla barrages.

September 24–25: Europe
In Scotland, Grampian Police warned of treacherous conditions as flooding hit Aberdeenshire and Aberdeen on September 23. Residents of the Meadows Care Home in Huntly, Aberdeenshire were moved to temporary shelder as the level of the River Deveron rose to danger level. 40 other local residents were given shelter at the Gordon Schools. Grampian Fire and Rescue Service said a number of crews from Huntly, Elgin, and the former Tayside region, along with the British Red Cross and a local coast-guard team, were all involved in the evacuation. Some schools were shut after several hours of torrential rain dramatically raised the level of a nearby Aberdeenshire river, while about 10 households in Soy Avenue and Durn Road, Portsoy were evacuated to a nearby care home. Parts of North Ayrshire, Glasgow, Lothian, and Argyll and Bute were also affected. Lothian and Borders Police later reported some flooding on West Maitland Street, Edinburgh, and High Street in Prestonpans.

The Met Office said that  of rain had fallen in 12 hours overnight; Glasgow normally has  of rain in all of September. Aberdeenshire also had  of rain in 12 hours, and it continued to rain for the rest of the day leaving an extra  of rain by nightfall. September 24 and 25 also saw patches of heavy rain hit various parts of Ireland, Belgium, and the Netherlands.

September 26–30

September 26–30: Africa

In Hadejia and Kararar Rima, Nigeria, the flood victims slept wherever they could; the men searched for dry spots on the roads, while women and children kept piling into the houses still standing, as huge numbers of displaced people returned to flood-hit villages in northern Nigeria. Over two million people were affected by the flood waters and more than fifty thousand families were made homeless. Most of the houses were made of clay, so they dissolved in the flood waters.

September 26–30: Americas
The Mississippi river started to rise and threatened St. Paul, Minnesota, with Mayor Chris Coleman declaring an emergency. The previous week's rain caused the Minnesota and Mississippi rivers to reach flood levels. Rising water levels after last week's heavy rainfall in southern Minnesota forced Water Street between Plato Boulevard and Minnesota 13 to be closed on September 28.

In Canada, the financial assistance department announced that up to CA$300,000 per claim would be available to the people harmed by heavy rains and flooding in the North Island and Central Coast areas. Areas including Port Alice, Port Hardy, Zeballos, and the Central Coast region's Bella Coola, Kingcome, and the Highway 20 corridor between Bella Coola and Anahim Lake would be covered.

September 26–30: Asia
September 26 saw heavy rain (causing more massive flooding) moving into Bihar and devastating an area around Patna. The Danapur Diyara district was the worst affected. Locals complained about a lack of emergency housing and supplies. The river Ganges breached its banks and flooded all low-lying areas, leaving many stranded due to flooded roads, collapsed bridges, and precautionary closures.

September 27 and 28 saw the flood situation reaching its worst at Agra where the river water level touched  on the morning of September 27. Many neighborhoods and ghats, such as the Taj Ganj cremation ghat, were submerged after several thunderstorms brought very heavy rainfall. Almost half of the city was without drinking water. Tourists visiting the Taj Mahal were asked to stay far away from the raging river. Settlements in the Balkeshwar and Dayalbagh areas have been inundated. More than 30 villages in the Bah tehsil have also been badly hit by the Yamuna river floods.

September 26–30: Oceania
In Waikato, people started preparing for floods as heavy rain threatened to push already-swollen rivers past their limits. Preparations were made for the worst as the region had already been hit by a storm the previous week. While further rain did fall, the most serious flooding at the start of October 2010 turned out to be south of Waikato in the central region of New Zealand.

October

October 23–28: North America

December

December 5–29: North America

Gallery

See also

2009–10 Australian region cyclone season
2009–10 North American winter
2009–10 South Pacific cyclone season
2009–10 South-West Indian Ocean cyclone season
2010 Atlantic hurricane season
2010 Central European floods
2010 eruptions of Eyjafjallajökull
2010 North Indian Ocean cyclone season
2010 Northern Hemisphere summer heat waves
2010 Pacific hurricane season
2010 Pacific typhoon season
2010 Pakistan floods
2010 Romanian floods
2010 Slovenia floods
2010 Var floods
2010 Victorian floods
2010 Victorian storms in Australia
2010 Western Australian storms in Earth's Southern Hemisphere
2010–11 Australian region cyclone season
2010–11 North American winter
2010–11 South Pacific cyclone season
2010–11 South-West Indian Ocean cyclone season
2013–14 North American winter
Arctic dipole anomaly
Arctic oscillation
Cyclogenesis
Early 2014 North American cold wave
El Niño-Southern Oscillation
February 2009 Great Britain and Ireland snowfall
Floods in 2010
Global storm activity of 2009
Gulf Stream
Jet stream
North Atlantic oscillation
Pacific–North American teleconnection pattern
Tornadoes of 2010
Tropical cyclones in 2010
Wildfires of 2010
Winter of 1946–47 in the United Kingdom
Winter of 1962–63 in the United Kingdom
Winter of 1990–91 in Western Europe
Winter of 2009–10 in Europe
Winter storm
Winter storms of 2009–10 in East Asia
2009–10 North American winter

References

2010 meteorology
2010 natural disasters
Weather events
Blizzards
Ice storms
Weather by year